

150001–150100 

|-bgcolor=#E9E9E9
| 150001 ||  || — || October 26, 2005 || Kitt Peak || Spacewatch || — || align=right | 3.3 km || 
|-id=002 bgcolor=#d6d6d6
| 150002 ||  || — || October 26, 2005 || Palomar || NEAT || EOS || align=right | 3.0 km || 
|-id=003 bgcolor=#d6d6d6
| 150003 ||  || — || October 31, 2005 || Kitt Peak || Spacewatch || — || align=right | 4.1 km || 
|-id=004 bgcolor=#E9E9E9
| 150004 ||  || — || October 23, 2005 || Kitt Peak || Spacewatch || — || align=right | 3.4 km || 
|-id=005 bgcolor=#d6d6d6
| 150005 ||  || — || October 24, 2005 || Kitt Peak || Spacewatch || — || align=right | 3.6 km || 
|-id=006 bgcolor=#E9E9E9
| 150006 ||  || — || October 25, 2005 || Kitt Peak || Spacewatch || — || align=right | 2.8 km || 
|-id=007 bgcolor=#d6d6d6
| 150007 ||  || — || October 25, 2005 || Mount Lemmon || Mount Lemmon Survey || — || align=right | 5.0 km || 
|-id=008 bgcolor=#d6d6d6
| 150008 ||  || — || October 25, 2005 || Kitt Peak || Spacewatch || — || align=right | 4.9 km || 
|-id=009 bgcolor=#d6d6d6
| 150009 ||  || — || October 26, 2005 || Kitt Peak || Spacewatch || — || align=right | 2.8 km || 
|-id=010 bgcolor=#d6d6d6
| 150010 ||  || — || October 27, 2005 || Kitt Peak || Spacewatch || — || align=right | 5.2 km || 
|-id=011 bgcolor=#d6d6d6
| 150011 ||  || — || October 25, 2005 || Mount Lemmon || Mount Lemmon Survey || THM || align=right | 3.7 km || 
|-id=012 bgcolor=#d6d6d6
| 150012 ||  || — || October 25, 2005 || Kitt Peak || Spacewatch || — || align=right | 3.4 km || 
|-id=013 bgcolor=#d6d6d6
| 150013 ||  || — || October 22, 2005 || Palomar || NEAT || — || align=right | 3.4 km || 
|-id=014 bgcolor=#d6d6d6
| 150014 ||  || — || October 31, 2005 || Anderson Mesa || LONEOS || 629 || align=right | 2.6 km || 
|-id=015 bgcolor=#d6d6d6
| 150015 ||  || — || October 27, 2005 || Palomar || NEAT || EOS || align=right | 5.7 km || 
|-id=016 bgcolor=#E9E9E9
| 150016 ||  || — || October 29, 2005 || Catalina || CSS || — || align=right | 3.6 km || 
|-id=017 bgcolor=#d6d6d6
| 150017 ||  || — || October 27, 2005 || Anderson Mesa || LONEOS || — || align=right | 4.9 km || 
|-id=018 bgcolor=#E9E9E9
| 150018 ||  || — || October 30, 2005 || Socorro || LINEAR || — || align=right | 4.6 km || 
|-id=019 bgcolor=#E9E9E9
| 150019 ||  || — || October 30, 2005 || Socorro || LINEAR || WIT || align=right | 1.7 km || 
|-id=020 bgcolor=#E9E9E9
| 150020 ||  || — || October 28, 2005 || Catalina || CSS || HEN || align=right | 1.5 km || 
|-id=021 bgcolor=#E9E9E9
| 150021 ||  || — || October 30, 2005 || Socorro || LINEAR || NEM || align=right | 4.3 km || 
|-id=022 bgcolor=#E9E9E9
| 150022 ||  || — || October 22, 2005 || Catalina || CSS || WIT || align=right | 1.8 km || 
|-id=023 bgcolor=#E9E9E9
| 150023 ||  || — || October 25, 2005 || Socorro || LINEAR || — || align=right | 4.3 km || 
|-id=024 bgcolor=#E9E9E9
| 150024 ||  || — || October 25, 2005 || Socorro || LINEAR || — || align=right | 3.1 km || 
|-id=025 bgcolor=#E9E9E9
| 150025 ||  || — || November 3, 2005 || Kitt Peak || Spacewatch || — || align=right | 1.3 km || 
|-id=026 bgcolor=#d6d6d6
| 150026 ||  || — || November 6, 2005 || Catalina || CSS || — || align=right | 5.0 km || 
|-id=027 bgcolor=#d6d6d6
| 150027 ||  || — || November 3, 2005 || Mount Lemmon || Mount Lemmon Survey || — || align=right | 4.3 km || 
|-id=028 bgcolor=#E9E9E9
| 150028 ||  || — || November 10, 2005 || Catalina || CSS || HNS || align=right | 2.7 km || 
|-id=029 bgcolor=#fefefe
| 150029 ||  || — || November 3, 2005 || Catalina || CSS || — || align=right | 2.8 km || 
|-id=030 bgcolor=#d6d6d6
| 150030 ||  || — || November 5, 2005 || Socorro || LINEAR || — || align=right | 6.3 km || 
|-id=031 bgcolor=#E9E9E9
| 150031 ||  || — || November 5, 2005 || Kitt Peak || Spacewatch || HNA || align=right | 4.0 km || 
|-id=032 bgcolor=#d6d6d6
| 150032 ||  || — || November 7, 2005 || Socorro || LINEAR || — || align=right | 3.7 km || 
|-id=033 bgcolor=#d6d6d6
| 150033 ||  || — || November 5, 2005 || Kitt Peak || Spacewatch || SHU3:2 || align=right | 7.4 km || 
|-id=034 bgcolor=#E9E9E9
| 150034 ||  || — || November 11, 2005 || Kitt Peak || Spacewatch || HOF || align=right | 3.8 km || 
|-id=035 bgcolor=#d6d6d6
| 150035 Williamson || 2005 WO ||  || November 20, 2005 || Wrightwood || J. W. Young || — || align=right | 3.5 km || 
|-id=036 bgcolor=#E9E9E9
| 150036 ||  || — || November 20, 2005 || Anderson Mesa || LONEOS || — || align=right | 2.0 km || 
|-id=037 bgcolor=#d6d6d6
| 150037 ||  || — || November 19, 2005 || Palomar || NEAT || — || align=right | 7.0 km || 
|-id=038 bgcolor=#d6d6d6
| 150038 ||  || — || November 24, 2005 || Palomar || NEAT || — || align=right | 6.6 km || 
|-id=039 bgcolor=#E9E9E9
| 150039 ||  || — || November 30, 2005 || Catalina || CSS || — || align=right | 4.5 km || 
|-id=040 bgcolor=#d6d6d6
| 150040 ||  || — || November 29, 2005 || Kitt Peak || Spacewatch || KOR || align=right | 2.1 km || 
|-id=041 bgcolor=#d6d6d6
| 150041 ||  || — || November 29, 2005 || Kitt Peak || Spacewatch || LIX || align=right | 7.5 km || 
|-id=042 bgcolor=#d6d6d6
| 150042 ||  || — || November 21, 2005 || Anderson Mesa || LONEOS || — || align=right | 4.1 km || 
|-id=043 bgcolor=#d6d6d6
| 150043 ||  || — || November 29, 2005 || Catalina || CSS || URS || align=right | 7.1 km || 
|-id=044 bgcolor=#E9E9E9
| 150044 ||  || — || November 29, 2005 || Catalina || CSS || EUN || align=right | 3.5 km || 
|-id=045 bgcolor=#d6d6d6
| 150045 ||  || — || November 29, 2005 || Palomar || NEAT || — || align=right | 5.7 km || 
|-id=046 bgcolor=#d6d6d6
| 150046 Cynthiaconrad ||  ||  || December 1, 2005 || Kitt Peak || M. W. Buie || — || align=right | 4.3 km || 
|-id=047 bgcolor=#E9E9E9
| 150047 ||  || — || December 23, 2005 || Kitt Peak || Spacewatch || — || align=right | 2.2 km || 
|-id=048 bgcolor=#E9E9E9
| 150048 ||  || — || December 23, 2005 || Socorro || LINEAR || EUN || align=right | 2.6 km || 
|-id=049 bgcolor=#E9E9E9
| 150049 ||  || — || July 19, 2006 || Hibiscus || S. F. Hönig || — || align=right | 3.8 km || 
|-id=050 bgcolor=#d6d6d6
| 150050 ||  || — || August 13, 2006 || Palomar || NEAT || K-2 || align=right | 2.3 km || 
|-id=051 bgcolor=#fefefe
| 150051 ||  || — || August 21, 2006 || Hibiscus || S. F. Hönig || — || align=right | 1.1 km || 
|-id=052 bgcolor=#E9E9E9
| 150052 ||  || — || August 21, 2006 || Hibiscus || S. F. Hönig || AGN || align=right | 1.8 km || 
|-id=053 bgcolor=#E9E9E9
| 150053 ||  || — || August 18, 2006 || Anderson Mesa || LONEOS || MIS || align=right | 3.5 km || 
|-id=054 bgcolor=#fefefe
| 150054 ||  || — || August 23, 2006 || Socorro || LINEAR || NYS || align=right | 1.5 km || 
|-id=055 bgcolor=#fefefe
| 150055 ||  || — || August 24, 2006 || Socorro || LINEAR || — || align=right | 1.4 km || 
|-id=056 bgcolor=#E9E9E9
| 150056 ||  || — || August 30, 2006 || Hibiscus || S. F. Hönig || — || align=right | 2.0 km || 
|-id=057 bgcolor=#E9E9E9
| 150057 ||  || — || August 28, 2006 || Socorro || LINEAR || DOR || align=right | 4.0 km || 
|-id=058 bgcolor=#fefefe
| 150058 ||  || — || August 18, 2006 || Kitt Peak || Spacewatch || — || align=right | 1.4 km || 
|-id=059 bgcolor=#E9E9E9
| 150059 ||  || — || August 30, 2006 || Anderson Mesa || LONEOS || — || align=right | 2.4 km || 
|-id=060 bgcolor=#fefefe
| 150060 ||  || — || September 12, 2006 || Catalina || CSS || — || align=right | 1.1 km || 
|-id=061 bgcolor=#d6d6d6
| 150061 ||  || — || September 13, 2006 || Palomar || NEAT || — || align=right | 3.7 km || 
|-id=062 bgcolor=#E9E9E9
| 150062 ||  || — || September 14, 2006 || Palomar || NEAT || — || align=right | 3.6 km || 
|-id=063 bgcolor=#fefefe
| 150063 ||  || — || September 12, 2006 || Catalina || CSS || NYS || align=right data-sort-value="0.88" | 880 m || 
|-id=064 bgcolor=#E9E9E9
| 150064 ||  || — || September 14, 2006 || Palomar || NEAT || — || align=right | 3.3 km || 
|-id=065 bgcolor=#E9E9E9
| 150065 ||  || — || September 14, 2006 || Catalina || CSS || GEF || align=right | 1.7 km || 
|-id=066 bgcolor=#d6d6d6
| 150066 ||  || — || September 16, 2006 || Catalina || CSS || — || align=right | 6.6 km || 
|-id=067 bgcolor=#d6d6d6
| 150067 ||  || — || September 16, 2006 || Anderson Mesa || LONEOS || — || align=right | 6.1 km || 
|-id=068 bgcolor=#fefefe
| 150068 ||  || — || September 16, 2006 || Anderson Mesa || LONEOS || — || align=right | 1.2 km || 
|-id=069 bgcolor=#d6d6d6
| 150069 ||  || — || September 18, 2006 || Catalina || CSS || — || align=right | 5.5 km || 
|-id=070 bgcolor=#E9E9E9
| 150070 ||  || — || September 20, 2006 || Anderson Mesa || LONEOS || — || align=right | 4.8 km || 
|-id=071 bgcolor=#d6d6d6
| 150071 ||  || — || September 21, 2006 || Anderson Mesa || LONEOS || — || align=right | 4.3 km || 
|-id=072 bgcolor=#fefefe
| 150072 ||  || — || September 20, 2006 || Palomar || NEAT || V || align=right | 1.1 km || 
|-id=073 bgcolor=#fefefe
| 150073 ||  || — || September 25, 2006 || Mount Lemmon || Mount Lemmon Survey || MAS || align=right | 1.4 km || 
|-id=074 bgcolor=#fefefe
| 150074 ||  || — || September 26, 2006 || Mount Lemmon || Mount Lemmon Survey || V || align=right data-sort-value="0.80" | 800 m || 
|-id=075 bgcolor=#d6d6d6
| 150075 ||  || — || September 25, 2006 || Kitt Peak || Spacewatch || 7:4 || align=right | 5.9 km || 
|-id=076 bgcolor=#E9E9E9
| 150076 ||  || — || September 25, 2006 || Anderson Mesa || LONEOS || MAR || align=right | 1.3 km || 
|-id=077 bgcolor=#fefefe
| 150077 ||  || — || September 30, 2006 || Catalina || CSS || — || align=right | 1.6 km || 
|-id=078 bgcolor=#d6d6d6
| 150078 ||  || — || October 12, 2006 || Kitt Peak || Spacewatch || THM || align=right | 4.3 km || 
|-id=079 bgcolor=#fefefe
| 150079 ||  || — || October 11, 2006 || Palomar || NEAT || NYS || align=right data-sort-value="0.96" | 960 m || 
|-id=080 bgcolor=#fefefe
| 150080 ||  || — || October 16, 2006 || Catalina || CSS || V || align=right data-sort-value="0.97" | 970 m || 
|-id=081 bgcolor=#fefefe
| 150081 Steindl ||  ||  || October 19, 2006 || Piszkéstető || K. Sárneczky || — || align=right | 1.1 km || 
|-id=082 bgcolor=#E9E9E9
| 150082 ||  || — || October 27, 2006 || Kitt Peak || Spacewatch || — || align=right | 2.6 km || 
|-id=083 bgcolor=#fefefe
| 150083 ||  || — || November 11, 2006 || Palomar || NEAT || — || align=right data-sort-value="0.96" | 960 m || 
|-id=084 bgcolor=#E9E9E9
| 150084 ||  || — || November 16, 2006 || Socorro || LINEAR || — || align=right | 2.9 km || 
|-id=085 bgcolor=#fefefe
| 150085 ||  || — || November 16, 2006 || Mount Lemmon || Mount Lemmon Survey || FLO || align=right | 1.0 km || 
|-id=086 bgcolor=#E9E9E9
| 150086 ||  || — || November 17, 2006 || Socorro || LINEAR || — || align=right | 4.0 km || 
|-id=087 bgcolor=#d6d6d6
| 150087 ||  || — || November 23, 2006 || Kitt Peak || Spacewatch || KOR || align=right | 1.9 km || 
|-id=088 bgcolor=#E9E9E9
| 150088 ||  || — || December 10, 2006 || Kitt Peak || Spacewatch || — || align=right | 2.4 km || 
|-id=089 bgcolor=#E9E9E9
| 150089 ||  || — || December 13, 2006 || Kitt Peak || Spacewatch || — || align=right | 3.6 km || 
|-id=090 bgcolor=#E9E9E9
| 150090 ||  || — || December 15, 2006 || Socorro || LINEAR || — || align=right | 1.8 km || 
|-id=091 bgcolor=#fefefe
| 150091 ||  || — || December 21, 2006 || Kitt Peak || Spacewatch || NYS || align=right | 1.1 km || 
|-id=092 bgcolor=#d6d6d6
| 150092 || 4156 P-L || — || September 24, 1960 || Palomar || PLS || — || align=right | 4.7 km || 
|-id=093 bgcolor=#E9E9E9
| 150093 || 4197 P-L || — || September 24, 1960 || Palomar || PLS || AEO || align=right | 1.9 km || 
|-id=094 bgcolor=#d6d6d6
| 150094 || 6845 P-L || — || September 24, 1960 || Palomar || PLS || — || align=right | 3.9 km || 
|-id=095 bgcolor=#fefefe
| 150095 || 1235 T-2 || — || September 29, 1973 || Palomar || PLS || — || align=right | 1.0 km || 
|-id=096 bgcolor=#fefefe
| 150096 || 3023 T-2 || — || September 30, 1973 || Palomar || PLS || — || align=right | 1.5 km || 
|-id=097 bgcolor=#fefefe
| 150097 || 4319 T-2 || — || September 29, 1973 || Palomar || PLS || NYS || align=right | 1.2 km || 
|-id=098 bgcolor=#fefefe
| 150098 || 5086 T-2 || — || September 25, 1973 || Palomar || PLS || — || align=right | 1.5 km || 
|-id=099 bgcolor=#d6d6d6
| 150099 || 1137 T-3 || — || October 17, 1977 || Palomar || PLS || EOS || align=right | 3.7 km || 
|-id=100 bgcolor=#fefefe
| 150100 || 1229 T-3 || — || October 17, 1977 || Palomar || PLS || — || align=right | 1.2 km || 
|}

150101–150200 

|-bgcolor=#d6d6d6
| 150101 || 2428 T-3 || — || October 16, 1977 || Palomar || PLS || — || align=right | 4.0 km || 
|-id=102 bgcolor=#fefefe
| 150102 || 3503 T-3 || — || October 16, 1977 || Palomar || PLS || — || align=right | 3.0 km || 
|-id=103 bgcolor=#E9E9E9
| 150103 || 4262 T-3 || — || October 16, 1977 || Palomar || PLS || — || align=right | 1.6 km || 
|-id=104 bgcolor=#E9E9E9
| 150104 || 5007 T-3 || — || October 16, 1977 || Palomar || PLS || — || align=right | 3.3 km || 
|-id=105 bgcolor=#E9E9E9
| 150105 || 5062 T-3 || — || October 16, 1977 || Palomar || PLS || DOR || align=right | 4.0 km || 
|-id=106 bgcolor=#fefefe
| 150106 || 5084 T-3 || — || October 16, 1977 || Palomar || PLS || ERI || align=right | 2.2 km || 
|-id=107 bgcolor=#fefefe
| 150107 ||  || — || November 7, 1978 || Palomar || E. F. Helin, S. J. Bus || — || align=right | 1.2 km || 
|-id=108 bgcolor=#fefefe
| 150108 ||  || — || August 22, 1979 || La Silla || C.-I. Lagerkvist || — || align=right | 1.2 km || 
|-id=109 bgcolor=#fefefe
| 150109 ||  || — || March 6, 1981 || Siding Spring || S. J. Bus || — || align=right | 1.9 km || 
|-id=110 bgcolor=#d6d6d6
| 150110 ||  || — || March 2, 1981 || Siding Spring || S. J. Bus || — || align=right | 6.4 km || 
|-id=111 bgcolor=#E9E9E9
| 150111 ||  || — || October 6, 1991 || Palomar || A. Lowe || — || align=right | 2.2 km || 
|-id=112 bgcolor=#E9E9E9
| 150112 ||  || — || October 6, 1991 || Palomar || A. Lowe || — || align=right | 3.7 km || 
|-id=113 bgcolor=#fefefe
| 150113 ||  || — || November 4, 1991 || Kushiro || S. Ueda, H. Kaneda || — || align=right | 1.8 km || 
|-id=114 bgcolor=#E9E9E9
| 150114 ||  || — || November 5, 1991 || Kitt Peak || Spacewatch || AGN || align=right | 1.8 km || 
|-id=115 bgcolor=#E9E9E9
| 150115 ||  || — || September 24, 1992 || Kitt Peak || Spacewatch || — || align=right | 3.3 km || 
|-id=116 bgcolor=#fefefe
| 150116 ||  || — || March 19, 1993 || La Silla || UESAC || NYS || align=right data-sort-value="0.96" | 960 m || 
|-id=117 bgcolor=#E9E9E9
| 150117 ||  || — || March 19, 1993 || La Silla || UESAC || GEF || align=right | 2.4 km || 
|-id=118 bgcolor=#d6d6d6
| 150118 Petersberg ||  ||  || September 18, 1993 || Tautenburg Observatory || F. Börngen, L. D. Schmadel || — || align=right | 4.7 km || 
|-id=119 bgcolor=#E9E9E9
| 150119 ||  || — || October 13, 1993 || Kitt Peak || Spacewatch || — || align=right | 1.1 km || 
|-id=120 bgcolor=#d6d6d6
| 150120 ||  || — || October 9, 1993 || La Silla || E. W. Elst || — || align=right | 5.2 km || 
|-id=121 bgcolor=#E9E9E9
| 150121 ||  || — || January 5, 1994 || Kitt Peak || Spacewatch || — || align=right | 1.3 km || 
|-id=122 bgcolor=#E9E9E9
| 150122 ||  || — || February 12, 1994 || Oizumi || T. Kobayashi || — || align=right | 5.7 km || 
|-id=123 bgcolor=#fefefe
| 150123 ||  || — || August 10, 1994 || La Silla || E. W. Elst || NYS || align=right | 1.3 km || 
|-id=124 bgcolor=#fefefe
| 150124 ||  || — || August 12, 1994 || La Silla || E. W. Elst || FLO || align=right data-sort-value="0.90" | 900 m || 
|-id=125 bgcolor=#fefefe
| 150125 ||  || — || August 12, 1994 || La Silla || E. W. Elst || — || align=right | 1.3 km || 
|-id=126 bgcolor=#fefefe
| 150126 ||  || — || September 28, 1994 || Kitt Peak || Spacewatch || MAS || align=right data-sort-value="0.98" | 980 m || 
|-id=127 bgcolor=#d6d6d6
| 150127 ||  || — || September 28, 1994 || Kitt Peak || Spacewatch || — || align=right | 3.2 km || 
|-id=128 bgcolor=#d6d6d6
| 150128 ||  || — || October 28, 1994 || Kitt Peak || Spacewatch || — || align=right | 4.6 km || 
|-id=129 bgcolor=#E9E9E9
| 150129 Besshi ||  ||  || November 8, 1994 || Kuma Kogen || A. Nakamura || — || align=right | 1.5 km || 
|-id=130 bgcolor=#E9E9E9
| 150130 ||  || — || January 8, 1995 || Kitt Peak || Spacewatch || — || align=right | 1.7 km || 
|-id=131 bgcolor=#fefefe
| 150131 ||  || — || January 29, 1995 || Kitt Peak || Spacewatch || — || align=right | 2.3 km || 
|-id=132 bgcolor=#E9E9E9
| 150132 ||  || — || February 24, 1995 || Kitt Peak || Spacewatch || — || align=right | 1.0 km || 
|-id=133 bgcolor=#E9E9E9
| 150133 ||  || — || July 26, 1995 || Kitt Peak || Spacewatch || — || align=right | 3.6 km || 
|-id=134 bgcolor=#d6d6d6
| 150134 ||  || — || September 26, 1995 || Kitt Peak || Spacewatch || KOR || align=right | 2.1 km || 
|-id=135 bgcolor=#fefefe
| 150135 ||  || — || October 27, 1995 || Oizumi || T. Kobayashi || — || align=right | 1.3 km || 
|-id=136 bgcolor=#fefefe
| 150136 ||  || — || November 14, 1995 || Kitt Peak || Spacewatch || — || align=right | 1.2 km || 
|-id=137 bgcolor=#d6d6d6
| 150137 ||  || — || November 15, 1995 || Kitt Peak || Spacewatch || EUP || align=right | 7.0 km || 
|-id=138 bgcolor=#fefefe
| 150138 ||  || — || November 16, 1995 || Kushiro || S. Ueda, H. Kaneda || PHO || align=right | 5.8 km || 
|-id=139 bgcolor=#d6d6d6
| 150139 ||  || — || November 23, 1995 || Kitt Peak || Spacewatch || — || align=right | 2.5 km || 
|-id=140 bgcolor=#E9E9E9
| 150140 ||  || — || December 16, 1995 || Kitt Peak || Spacewatch || — || align=right | 5.1 km || 
|-id=141 bgcolor=#fefefe
| 150141 ||  || — || December 16, 1995 || Kitt Peak || Spacewatch || — || align=right | 1.1 km || 
|-id=142 bgcolor=#fefefe
| 150142 ||  || — || December 16, 1995 || Kitt Peak || Spacewatch || FLO || align=right | 1.2 km || 
|-id=143 bgcolor=#d6d6d6
| 150143 ||  || — || January 12, 1996 || Kitt Peak || Spacewatch || — || align=right | 4.4 km || 
|-id=144 bgcolor=#fefefe
| 150144 ||  || — || January 14, 1996 || Kitt Peak || Spacewatch || V || align=right data-sort-value="0.95" | 950 m || 
|-id=145 bgcolor=#d6d6d6
| 150145 Uvic ||  ||  || January 23, 1996 || NRC-DAO || D. D. Balam || — || align=right | 7.5 km || 
|-id=146 bgcolor=#d6d6d6
| 150146 ||  || — || March 12, 1996 || Kitt Peak || Spacewatch || THM || align=right | 2.9 km || 
|-id=147 bgcolor=#fefefe
| 150147 ||  || — || March 12, 1996 || Kitt Peak || Spacewatch || — || align=right | 2.0 km || 
|-id=148 bgcolor=#fefefe
| 150148 ||  || — || March 20, 1996 || Haleakala || AMOS || — || align=right data-sort-value="0.99" | 990 m || 
|-id=149 bgcolor=#fefefe
| 150149 ||  || — || May 15, 1996 || Kitt Peak || Spacewatch || V || align=right | 1.3 km || 
|-id=150 bgcolor=#E9E9E9
| 150150 ||  || — || October 6, 1996 || Kitt Peak || Spacewatch || — || align=right | 2.8 km || 
|-id=151 bgcolor=#E9E9E9
| 150151 ||  || — || October 7, 1996 || Kitt Peak || Spacewatch || — || align=right | 3.3 km || 
|-id=152 bgcolor=#E9E9E9
| 150152 ||  || — || November 5, 1996 || Kitt Peak || Spacewatch || AST || align=right | 2.5 km || 
|-id=153 bgcolor=#d6d6d6
| 150153 || 1997 AB || — || January 1, 1997 || Prescott || P. G. Comba || — || align=right | 3.0 km || 
|-id=154 bgcolor=#d6d6d6
| 150154 ||  || — || March 5, 1997 || Kitt Peak || Spacewatch || KOR || align=right | 1.9 km || 
|-id=155 bgcolor=#d6d6d6
| 150155 ||  || — || March 11, 1997 || Kitt Peak || Spacewatch || — || align=right | 3.6 km || 
|-id=156 bgcolor=#fefefe
| 150156 ||  || — || March 11, 1997 || Kitt Peak || Spacewatch || — || align=right | 1.2 km || 
|-id=157 bgcolor=#fefefe
| 150157 ||  || — || April 11, 1997 || Ondřejov || P. Pravec || PHO || align=right | 3.1 km || 
|-id=158 bgcolor=#d6d6d6
| 150158 ||  || — || April 29, 1997 || Kitt Peak || Spacewatch || — || align=right | 3.9 km || 
|-id=159 bgcolor=#fefefe
| 150159 ||  || — || May 1, 1997 || Caussols || ODAS || — || align=right | 1.4 km || 
|-id=160 bgcolor=#E9E9E9
| 150160 ||  || — || July 30, 1997 || Caussols || ODAS || — || align=right | 2.0 km || 
|-id=161 bgcolor=#fefefe
| 150161 ||  || — || August 11, 1997 || Xinglong || SCAP || NYS || align=right | 1.6 km || 
|-id=162 bgcolor=#fefefe
| 150162 || 1997 SO || — || September 20, 1997 || Ondřejov || L. Kotková || — || align=right | 2.1 km || 
|-id=163 bgcolor=#fefefe
| 150163 ||  || — || September 29, 1997 || Kitt Peak || Spacewatch || — || align=right | 1.6 km || 
|-id=164 bgcolor=#E9E9E9
| 150164 ||  || — || October 2, 1997 || Caussols || ODAS || — || align=right | 1.3 km || 
|-id=165 bgcolor=#FA8072
| 150165 ||  || — || October 29, 1997 || Haleakala || NEAT || — || align=right | 1.7 km || 
|-id=166 bgcolor=#E9E9E9
| 150166 ||  || — || November 21, 1997 || Xinglong || SCAP || — || align=right | 1.4 km || 
|-id=167 bgcolor=#E9E9E9
| 150167 ||  || — || December 3, 1997 || Oizumi || T. Kobayashi || — || align=right | 1.5 km || 
|-id=168 bgcolor=#E9E9E9
| 150168 ||  || — || January 22, 1998 || Kitt Peak || Spacewatch || — || align=right | 2.5 km || 
|-id=169 bgcolor=#E9E9E9
| 150169 ||  || — || January 29, 1998 || Kitt Peak || Spacewatch || — || align=right | 2.5 km || 
|-id=170 bgcolor=#E9E9E9
| 150170 ||  || — || January 25, 1998 || Kitt Peak || Spacewatch || — || align=right | 3.4 km || 
|-id=171 bgcolor=#E9E9E9
| 150171 ||  || — || February 26, 1998 || Kitt Peak || Spacewatch || — || align=right | 3.1 km || 
|-id=172 bgcolor=#E9E9E9
| 150172 ||  || — || February 23, 1998 || Kitt Peak || Spacewatch || NEM || align=right | 3.2 km || 
|-id=173 bgcolor=#E9E9E9
| 150173 ||  || — || February 26, 1998 || Kitt Peak || Spacewatch || — || align=right | 4.4 km || 
|-id=174 bgcolor=#E9E9E9
| 150174 ||  || — || February 25, 1998 || Xinglong || SCAP || — || align=right | 6.6 km || 
|-id=175 bgcolor=#E9E9E9
| 150175 ||  || — || March 1, 1998 || La Silla || E. W. Elst || INO || align=right | 2.1 km || 
|-id=176 bgcolor=#E9E9E9
| 150176 ||  || — || March 3, 1998 || La Silla || E. W. Elst || — || align=right | 3.0 km || 
|-id=177 bgcolor=#d6d6d6
| 150177 || 1998 FR || — || March 18, 1998 || Kitt Peak || Spacewatch || KOR || align=right | 2.1 km || 
|-id=178 bgcolor=#E9E9E9
| 150178 ||  || — || March 22, 1998 || Kitt Peak || Spacewatch || — || align=right | 3.7 km || 
|-id=179 bgcolor=#E9E9E9
| 150179 ||  || — || March 27, 1998 || Woomera || F. B. Zoltowski || — || align=right | 4.0 km || 
|-id=180 bgcolor=#E9E9E9
| 150180 ||  || — || March 28, 1998 || Caussols || ODAS || — || align=right | 3.7 km || 
|-id=181 bgcolor=#E9E9E9
| 150181 ||  || — || March 20, 1998 || Socorro || LINEAR || — || align=right | 3.4 km || 
|-id=182 bgcolor=#E9E9E9
| 150182 ||  || — || April 2, 1998 || Socorro || LINEAR || — || align=right | 5.1 km || 
|-id=183 bgcolor=#E9E9E9
| 150183 ||  || — || April 21, 1998 || Caussols || ODAS || — || align=right | 4.4 km || 
|-id=184 bgcolor=#E9E9E9
| 150184 ||  || — || April 23, 1998 || Kitt Peak || Spacewatch || DOR || align=right | 4.3 km || 
|-id=185 bgcolor=#d6d6d6
| 150185 ||  || — || April 21, 1998 || Socorro || LINEAR || THM || align=right | 4.2 km || 
|-id=186 bgcolor=#d6d6d6
| 150186 ||  || — || May 28, 1998 || Kitt Peak || Spacewatch || — || align=right | 4.3 km || 
|-id=187 bgcolor=#d6d6d6
| 150187 ||  || — || June 21, 1998 || Kitt Peak || Spacewatch || — || align=right | 4.6 km || 
|-id=188 bgcolor=#d6d6d6
| 150188 ||  || — || June 27, 1998 || Kitt Peak || Spacewatch || — || align=right | 5.0 km || 
|-id=189 bgcolor=#fefefe
| 150189 ||  || — || June 26, 1998 || La Silla || E. W. Elst || — || align=right | 1.5 km || 
|-id=190 bgcolor=#fefefe
| 150190 ||  || — || August 22, 1998 || Xinglong || SCAP || V || align=right | 1.3 km || 
|-id=191 bgcolor=#fefefe
| 150191 ||  || — || August 17, 1998 || Socorro || LINEAR || — || align=right | 1.5 km || 
|-id=192 bgcolor=#fefefe
| 150192 ||  || — || August 30, 1998 || Kitt Peak || Spacewatch || — || align=right | 1.1 km || 
|-id=193 bgcolor=#fefefe
| 150193 ||  || — || August 24, 1998 || Socorro || LINEAR || FLO || align=right | 1.2 km || 
|-id=194 bgcolor=#fefefe
| 150194 ||  || — || August 26, 1998 || La Silla || E. W. Elst || — || align=right | 1.3 km || 
|-id=195 bgcolor=#fefefe
| 150195 ||  || — || August 26, 1998 || La Silla || E. W. Elst || — || align=right | 3.3 km || 
|-id=196 bgcolor=#fefefe
| 150196 ||  || — || September 14, 1998 || Socorro || LINEAR || — || align=right | 1.6 km || 
|-id=197 bgcolor=#fefefe
| 150197 ||  || — || September 13, 1998 || Kitt Peak || Spacewatch || NYS || align=right | 2.2 km || 
|-id=198 bgcolor=#d6d6d6
| 150198 ||  || — || September 14, 1998 || Socorro || LINEAR || — || align=right | 5.5 km || 
|-id=199 bgcolor=#fefefe
| 150199 ||  || — || September 14, 1998 || Socorro || LINEAR || — || align=right | 1.4 km || 
|-id=200 bgcolor=#fefefe
| 150200 ||  || — || September 14, 1998 || Socorro || LINEAR || FLO || align=right | 1.2 km || 
|}

150201–150300 

|-bgcolor=#d6d6d6
| 150201 ||  || — || September 14, 1998 || Socorro || LINEAR || TIR || align=right | 6.6 km || 
|-id=202 bgcolor=#fefefe
| 150202 ||  || — || September 14, 1998 || Socorro || LINEAR || FLO || align=right | 1.1 km || 
|-id=203 bgcolor=#fefefe
| 150203 ||  || — || September 14, 1998 || Socorro || LINEAR || — || align=right data-sort-value="0.93" | 930 m || 
|-id=204 bgcolor=#fefefe
| 150204 ||  || — || September 14, 1998 || Socorro || LINEAR || — || align=right | 1.3 km || 
|-id=205 bgcolor=#fefefe
| 150205 ||  || — || September 14, 1998 || Socorro || LINEAR || — || align=right | 2.0 km || 
|-id=206 bgcolor=#fefefe
| 150206 ||  || — || September 17, 1998 || Xinglong || SCAP || NYS || align=right | 1.1 km || 
|-id=207 bgcolor=#fefefe
| 150207 ||  || — || September 18, 1998 || Kitt Peak || Spacewatch || V || align=right | 1.2 km || 
|-id=208 bgcolor=#fefefe
| 150208 ||  || — || September 26, 1998 || Kitt Peak || Spacewatch || NYS || align=right | 1.1 km || 
|-id=209 bgcolor=#fefefe
| 150209 ||  || — || September 28, 1998 || Kitt Peak || Spacewatch || — || align=right | 2.4 km || 
|-id=210 bgcolor=#fefefe
| 150210 ||  || — || September 16, 1998 || Anderson Mesa || LONEOS || NYS || align=right | 1.1 km || 
|-id=211 bgcolor=#d6d6d6
| 150211 ||  || — || September 19, 1998 || Socorro || LINEAR || — || align=right | 5.3 km || 
|-id=212 bgcolor=#d6d6d6
| 150212 ||  || — || September 26, 1998 || Socorro || LINEAR || THM || align=right | 4.9 km || 
|-id=213 bgcolor=#fefefe
| 150213 ||  || — || September 26, 1998 || Socorro || LINEAR || — || align=right | 1.4 km || 
|-id=214 bgcolor=#fefefe
| 150214 ||  || — || September 26, 1998 || Socorro || LINEAR || V || align=right | 1.1 km || 
|-id=215 bgcolor=#fefefe
| 150215 ||  || — || September 26, 1998 || Socorro || LINEAR || FLO || align=right | 1.2 km || 
|-id=216 bgcolor=#fefefe
| 150216 ||  || — || September 26, 1998 || Socorro || LINEAR || — || align=right | 1.5 km || 
|-id=217 bgcolor=#fefefe
| 150217 ||  || — || September 26, 1998 || Socorro || LINEAR || FLO || align=right | 1.0 km || 
|-id=218 bgcolor=#fefefe
| 150218 ||  || — || September 26, 1998 || Socorro || LINEAR || ERI || align=right | 3.2 km || 
|-id=219 bgcolor=#fefefe
| 150219 ||  || — || September 26, 1998 || Socorro || LINEAR || NYS || align=right | 1.2 km || 
|-id=220 bgcolor=#fefefe
| 150220 ||  || — || September 26, 1998 || Socorro || LINEAR || — || align=right | 1.5 km || 
|-id=221 bgcolor=#fefefe
| 150221 ||  || — || September 26, 1998 || Socorro || LINEAR || MAS || align=right | 1.2 km || 
|-id=222 bgcolor=#fefefe
| 150222 ||  || — || October 13, 1998 || Kitt Peak || Spacewatch || MAS || align=right | 1.1 km || 
|-id=223 bgcolor=#fefefe
| 150223 ||  || — || October 13, 1998 || Kitt Peak || Spacewatch || — || align=right | 2.9 km || 
|-id=224 bgcolor=#fefefe
| 150224 ||  || — || October 19, 1998 || Catalina || CSS || H || align=right data-sort-value="0.86" | 860 m || 
|-id=225 bgcolor=#fefefe
| 150225 ||  || — || October 28, 1998 || Dossobuono || L. Lai || — || align=right | 1.5 km || 
|-id=226 bgcolor=#fefefe
| 150226 ||  || — || October 28, 1998 || Socorro || LINEAR || — || align=right | 1.6 km || 
|-id=227 bgcolor=#fefefe
| 150227 ||  || — || October 28, 1998 || Socorro || LINEAR || — || align=right | 1.9 km || 
|-id=228 bgcolor=#fefefe
| 150228 ||  || — || November 10, 1998 || Caussols || ODAS || — || align=right | 1.8 km || 
|-id=229 bgcolor=#fefefe
| 150229 ||  || — || November 10, 1998 || Socorro || LINEAR || — || align=right | 1.5 km || 
|-id=230 bgcolor=#fefefe
| 150230 ||  || — || November 10, 1998 || Socorro || LINEAR || ERI || align=right | 3.5 km || 
|-id=231 bgcolor=#E9E9E9
| 150231 ||  || — || November 23, 1998 || Kitt Peak || Spacewatch || — || align=right | 3.1 km || 
|-id=232 bgcolor=#fefefe
| 150232 ||  || — || December 7, 1998 || Caussols || ODAS || NYS || align=right | 1.1 km || 
|-id=233 bgcolor=#fefefe
| 150233 ||  || — || December 10, 1998 || Kitt Peak || Spacewatch || NYS || align=right | 1.2 km || 
|-id=234 bgcolor=#fefefe
| 150234 ||  || — || December 15, 1998 || Caussols || ODAS || — || align=right | 1.0 km || 
|-id=235 bgcolor=#E9E9E9
| 150235 ||  || — || December 8, 1998 || Kitt Peak || Spacewatch || — || align=right | 1.6 km || 
|-id=236 bgcolor=#E9E9E9
| 150236 ||  || — || December 10, 1998 || Kitt Peak || Spacewatch || — || align=right | 1.9 km || 
|-id=237 bgcolor=#fefefe
| 150237 ||  || — || December 11, 1998 || Kitt Peak || Spacewatch || V || align=right | 1.2 km || 
|-id=238 bgcolor=#fefefe
| 150238 ||  || — || December 23, 1998 || San Marcello || L. Tesi, A. Boattini || MAS || align=right | 1.3 km || 
|-id=239 bgcolor=#fefefe
| 150239 ||  || — || January 7, 1999 || Kitt Peak || Spacewatch || V || align=right | 1.2 km || 
|-id=240 bgcolor=#fefefe
| 150240 ||  || — || February 12, 1999 || Socorro || LINEAR || H || align=right data-sort-value="0.98" | 980 m || 
|-id=241 bgcolor=#E9E9E9
| 150241 ||  || — || February 10, 1999 || Socorro || LINEAR || — || align=right | 3.7 km || 
|-id=242 bgcolor=#E9E9E9
| 150242 ||  || — || February 10, 1999 || Socorro || LINEAR || — || align=right | 2.7 km || 
|-id=243 bgcolor=#E9E9E9
| 150243 ||  || — || February 7, 1999 || Kitt Peak || Spacewatch || — || align=right | 1.8 km || 
|-id=244 bgcolor=#E9E9E9
| 150244 ||  || — || February 9, 1999 || Kitt Peak || Spacewatch || — || align=right | 1.3 km || 
|-id=245 bgcolor=#fefefe
| 150245 ||  || — || March 20, 1999 || Socorro || LINEAR || H || align=right | 1.3 km || 
|-id=246 bgcolor=#E9E9E9
| 150246 ||  || — || April 6, 1999 || Kitt Peak || Spacewatch || — || align=right | 1.5 km || 
|-id=247 bgcolor=#E9E9E9
| 150247 ||  || — || May 10, 1999 || Socorro || LINEAR || — || align=right | 2.0 km || 
|-id=248 bgcolor=#E9E9E9
| 150248 ||  || — || May 10, 1999 || Socorro || LINEAR || — || align=right | 2.4 km || 
|-id=249 bgcolor=#E9E9E9
| 150249 ||  || — || May 12, 1999 || Socorro || LINEAR || — || align=right | 2.5 km || 
|-id=250 bgcolor=#E9E9E9
| 150250 ||  || — || May 12, 1999 || Socorro || LINEAR || — || align=right | 4.3 km || 
|-id=251 bgcolor=#E9E9E9
| 150251 ||  || — || May 12, 1999 || Socorro || LINEAR || — || align=right | 3.3 km || 
|-id=252 bgcolor=#fefefe
| 150252 ||  || — || June 11, 1999 || Socorro || LINEAR || H || align=right | 1.1 km || 
|-id=253 bgcolor=#E9E9E9
| 150253 ||  || — || June 8, 1999 || Socorro || LINEAR || EUN || align=right | 3.7 km || 
|-id=254 bgcolor=#E9E9E9
| 150254 ||  || — || June 14, 1999 || Kitt Peak || Spacewatch || EUN || align=right | 2.1 km || 
|-id=255 bgcolor=#E9E9E9
| 150255 ||  || — || July 12, 1999 || Socorro || LINEAR || — || align=right | 3.2 km || 
|-id=256 bgcolor=#d6d6d6
| 150256 ||  || — || August 3, 1999 || Kitt Peak || Spacewatch || — || align=right | 3.6 km || 
|-id=257 bgcolor=#fefefe
| 150257 ||  || — || September 3, 1999 || Kitt Peak || Spacewatch || — || align=right | 1.1 km || 
|-id=258 bgcolor=#d6d6d6
| 150258 ||  || — || September 7, 1999 || Socorro || LINEAR || — || align=right | 3.9 km || 
|-id=259 bgcolor=#E9E9E9
| 150259 ||  || — || September 8, 1999 || Socorro || LINEAR || — || align=right | 5.2 km || 
|-id=260 bgcolor=#E9E9E9
| 150260 ||  || — || September 7, 1999 || Socorro || LINEAR || — || align=right | 3.3 km || 
|-id=261 bgcolor=#d6d6d6
| 150261 ||  || — || September 7, 1999 || Socorro || LINEAR || — || align=right | 5.5 km || 
|-id=262 bgcolor=#d6d6d6
| 150262 ||  || — || September 13, 1999 || Kitt Peak || Spacewatch || KOR || align=right | 1.9 km || 
|-id=263 bgcolor=#d6d6d6
| 150263 ||  || — || September 8, 1999 || Socorro || LINEAR || EOS || align=right | 3.5 km || 
|-id=264 bgcolor=#d6d6d6
| 150264 ||  || — || September 8, 1999 || Socorro || LINEAR || 7:4 || align=right | 7.3 km || 
|-id=265 bgcolor=#E9E9E9
| 150265 ||  || — || September 9, 1999 || Socorro || LINEAR || — || align=right | 4.7 km || 
|-id=266 bgcolor=#d6d6d6
| 150266 ||  || — || September 9, 1999 || Socorro || LINEAR || — || align=right | 5.6 km || 
|-id=267 bgcolor=#d6d6d6
| 150267 ||  || — || September 9, 1999 || Socorro || LINEAR || EUP || align=right | 7.0 km || 
|-id=268 bgcolor=#d6d6d6
| 150268 ||  || — || September 9, 1999 || Socorro || LINEAR || — || align=right | 2.9 km || 
|-id=269 bgcolor=#d6d6d6
| 150269 ||  || — || September 9, 1999 || Socorro || LINEAR || — || align=right | 3.7 km || 
|-id=270 bgcolor=#d6d6d6
| 150270 ||  || — || September 14, 1999 || Kitt Peak || Spacewatch || — || align=right | 3.5 km || 
|-id=271 bgcolor=#d6d6d6
| 150271 ||  || — || September 8, 1999 || Socorro || LINEAR || — || align=right | 5.9 km || 
|-id=272 bgcolor=#d6d6d6
| 150272 ||  || — || September 8, 1999 || Socorro || LINEAR || — || align=right | 11 km || 
|-id=273 bgcolor=#d6d6d6
| 150273 ||  || — || September 8, 1999 || Catalina || CSS || — || align=right | 3.5 km || 
|-id=274 bgcolor=#d6d6d6
| 150274 || 1999 SS || — || September 16, 1999 || Kitt Peak || Spacewatch || — || align=right | 6.1 km || 
|-id=275 bgcolor=#fefefe
| 150275 ||  || — || October 14, 1999 || Ondřejov || L. Kotková || FLO || align=right data-sort-value="0.84" | 840 m || 
|-id=276 bgcolor=#d6d6d6
| 150276 ||  || — || October 1, 1999 || Catalina || CSS || — || align=right | 6.2 km || 
|-id=277 bgcolor=#d6d6d6
| 150277 ||  || — || October 3, 1999 || Kitt Peak || Spacewatch || HYG || align=right | 5.2 km || 
|-id=278 bgcolor=#d6d6d6
| 150278 ||  || — || October 4, 1999 || Kitt Peak || Spacewatch || — || align=right | 4.5 km || 
|-id=279 bgcolor=#d6d6d6
| 150279 ||  || — || October 4, 1999 || Kitt Peak || Spacewatch || THM || align=right | 4.0 km || 
|-id=280 bgcolor=#d6d6d6
| 150280 ||  || — || October 6, 1999 || Kitt Peak || Spacewatch || THM || align=right | 4.4 km || 
|-id=281 bgcolor=#d6d6d6
| 150281 ||  || — || October 6, 1999 || Kitt Peak || Spacewatch || HYG || align=right | 4.8 km || 
|-id=282 bgcolor=#d6d6d6
| 150282 ||  || — || October 10, 1999 || Kitt Peak || Spacewatch || — || align=right | 2.8 km || 
|-id=283 bgcolor=#d6d6d6
| 150283 ||  || — || October 12, 1999 || Kitt Peak || Spacewatch || — || align=right | 4.5 km || 
|-id=284 bgcolor=#fefefe
| 150284 ||  || — || October 2, 1999 || Socorro || LINEAR || FLO || align=right | 1.3 km || 
|-id=285 bgcolor=#d6d6d6
| 150285 ||  || — || October 2, 1999 || Socorro || LINEAR || — || align=right | 5.5 km || 
|-id=286 bgcolor=#E9E9E9
| 150286 ||  || — || October 2, 1999 || Socorro || LINEAR || — || align=right | 4.5 km || 
|-id=287 bgcolor=#d6d6d6
| 150287 ||  || — || October 4, 1999 || Socorro || LINEAR || — || align=right | 6.2 km || 
|-id=288 bgcolor=#d6d6d6
| 150288 ||  || — || October 4, 1999 || Socorro || LINEAR || — || align=right | 5.5 km || 
|-id=289 bgcolor=#d6d6d6
| 150289 ||  || — || October 7, 1999 || Socorro || LINEAR || HYG || align=right | 4.6 km || 
|-id=290 bgcolor=#d6d6d6
| 150290 ||  || — || October 7, 1999 || Socorro || LINEAR || VER || align=right | 6.5 km || 
|-id=291 bgcolor=#fefefe
| 150291 ||  || — || October 7, 1999 || Socorro || LINEAR || — || align=right | 1.3 km || 
|-id=292 bgcolor=#fefefe
| 150292 ||  || — || October 9, 1999 || Socorro || LINEAR || — || align=right | 1.2 km || 
|-id=293 bgcolor=#fefefe
| 150293 ||  || — || October 10, 1999 || Socorro || LINEAR || — || align=right | 1.3 km || 
|-id=294 bgcolor=#d6d6d6
| 150294 ||  || — || October 10, 1999 || Socorro || LINEAR || HYG || align=right | 4.8 km || 
|-id=295 bgcolor=#d6d6d6
| 150295 ||  || — || October 12, 1999 || Socorro || LINEAR || — || align=right | 3.7 km || 
|-id=296 bgcolor=#d6d6d6
| 150296 ||  || — || October 13, 1999 || Socorro || LINEAR || — || align=right | 3.9 km || 
|-id=297 bgcolor=#d6d6d6
| 150297 ||  || — || October 15, 1999 || Socorro || LINEAR || CRO || align=right | 6.9 km || 
|-id=298 bgcolor=#d6d6d6
| 150298 ||  || — || October 15, 1999 || Socorro || LINEAR || EOS || align=right | 3.2 km || 
|-id=299 bgcolor=#d6d6d6
| 150299 ||  || — || October 15, 1999 || Socorro || LINEAR || — || align=right | 5.8 km || 
|-id=300 bgcolor=#d6d6d6
| 150300 ||  || — || October 3, 1999 || Kitt Peak || Spacewatch || — || align=right | 4.5 km || 
|}

150301–150400 

|-bgcolor=#d6d6d6
| 150301 ||  || — || October 3, 1999 || Socorro || LINEAR || — || align=right | 5.0 km || 
|-id=302 bgcolor=#d6d6d6
| 150302 ||  || — || October 3, 1999 || Catalina || CSS || — || align=right | 4.9 km || 
|-id=303 bgcolor=#d6d6d6
| 150303 ||  || — || October 9, 1999 || Catalina || CSS || — || align=right | 3.8 km || 
|-id=304 bgcolor=#E9E9E9
| 150304 ||  || — || October 9, 1999 || Socorro || LINEAR || — || align=right | 5.0 km || 
|-id=305 bgcolor=#d6d6d6
| 150305 ||  || — || October 7, 1999 || Socorro || LINEAR || — || align=right | 5.7 km || 
|-id=306 bgcolor=#d6d6d6
| 150306 ||  || — || October 1, 1999 || Catalina || CSS || — || align=right | 5.6 km || 
|-id=307 bgcolor=#d6d6d6
| 150307 ||  || — || October 4, 1999 || Kitt Peak || Spacewatch || — || align=right | 2.8 km || 
|-id=308 bgcolor=#fefefe
| 150308 ||  || — || October 10, 1999 || Socorro || LINEAR || — || align=right | 1.1 km || 
|-id=309 bgcolor=#fefefe
| 150309 ||  || — || October 19, 1999 || Ondřejov || P. Pravec, P. Kušnirák || — || align=right data-sort-value="0.94" | 940 m || 
|-id=310 bgcolor=#d6d6d6
| 150310 ||  || — || October 31, 1999 || Kitt Peak || Spacewatch || — || align=right | 7.5 km || 
|-id=311 bgcolor=#fefefe
| 150311 ||  || — || October 30, 1999 || Kitt Peak || Spacewatch || — || align=right | 1.2 km || 
|-id=312 bgcolor=#d6d6d6
| 150312 ||  || — || October 31, 1999 || Kitt Peak || Spacewatch || — || align=right | 3.7 km || 
|-id=313 bgcolor=#fefefe
| 150313 ||  || — || October 31, 1999 || Kitt Peak || Spacewatch || — || align=right data-sort-value="0.82" | 820 m || 
|-id=314 bgcolor=#d6d6d6
| 150314 ||  || — || October 19, 1999 || Kitt Peak || Spacewatch || — || align=right | 3.5 km || 
|-id=315 bgcolor=#d6d6d6
| 150315 ||  || — || October 30, 1999 || Kitt Peak || Spacewatch || CHA || align=right | 3.4 km || 
|-id=316 bgcolor=#fefefe
| 150316 Ivaniosifovich ||  ||  || November 1, 1999 || Uccle || E. W. Elst, S. I. Ipatov || — || align=right | 1.4 km || 
|-id=317 bgcolor=#fefefe
| 150317 ||  || — || November 1, 1999 || Kitt Peak || Spacewatch || — || align=right | 1.1 km || 
|-id=318 bgcolor=#d6d6d6
| 150318 ||  || — || November 4, 1999 || Kitt Peak || Spacewatch || THM || align=right | 4.6 km || 
|-id=319 bgcolor=#fefefe
| 150319 ||  || — || November 4, 1999 || Socorro || LINEAR || FLO || align=right | 1.2 km || 
|-id=320 bgcolor=#d6d6d6
| 150320 ||  || — || November 4, 1999 || Socorro || LINEAR || VER || align=right | 7.8 km || 
|-id=321 bgcolor=#d6d6d6
| 150321 ||  || — || November 2, 1999 || Kitt Peak || Spacewatch || HYG || align=right | 4.6 km || 
|-id=322 bgcolor=#d6d6d6
| 150322 ||  || — || November 6, 1999 || Kitt Peak || Spacewatch || THM || align=right | 3.3 km || 
|-id=323 bgcolor=#fefefe
| 150323 ||  || — || November 9, 1999 || Socorro || LINEAR || — || align=right | 1.1 km || 
|-id=324 bgcolor=#d6d6d6
| 150324 ||  || — || November 9, 1999 || Socorro || LINEAR || THM || align=right | 3.7 km || 
|-id=325 bgcolor=#fefefe
| 150325 ||  || — || November 9, 1999 || Socorro || LINEAR || — || align=right | 1.3 km || 
|-id=326 bgcolor=#fefefe
| 150326 ||  || — || November 10, 1999 || Kitt Peak || Spacewatch || — || align=right data-sort-value="0.93" | 930 m || 
|-id=327 bgcolor=#d6d6d6
| 150327 ||  || — || November 10, 1999 || Kitt Peak || Spacewatch || — || align=right | 4.4 km || 
|-id=328 bgcolor=#d6d6d6
| 150328 ||  || — || November 13, 1999 || Kitt Peak || Spacewatch || HYG || align=right | 4.6 km || 
|-id=329 bgcolor=#fefefe
| 150329 ||  || — || November 1, 1999 || Anderson Mesa || LONEOS || — || align=right | 1.4 km || 
|-id=330 bgcolor=#d6d6d6
| 150330 ||  || — || November 6, 1999 || Socorro || LINEAR || — || align=right | 6.4 km || 
|-id=331 bgcolor=#fefefe
| 150331 ||  || — || November 5, 1999 || Socorro || LINEAR || — || align=right data-sort-value="0.96" | 960 m || 
|-id=332 bgcolor=#fefefe
| 150332 ||  || — || November 12, 1999 || Socorro || LINEAR || — || align=right data-sort-value="0.92" | 920 m || 
|-id=333 bgcolor=#d6d6d6
| 150333 ||  || — || November 15, 1999 || Socorro || LINEAR || THM || align=right | 4.9 km || 
|-id=334 bgcolor=#d6d6d6
| 150334 ||  || — || November 3, 1999 || Catalina || CSS || THM || align=right | 4.5 km || 
|-id=335 bgcolor=#d6d6d6
| 150335 ||  || — || November 4, 1999 || Kitt Peak || Spacewatch || — || align=right | 3.9 km || 
|-id=336 bgcolor=#fefefe
| 150336 ||  || — || November 28, 1999 || Kitt Peak || Spacewatch || — || align=right | 1.1 km || 
|-id=337 bgcolor=#d6d6d6
| 150337 ||  || — || November 29, 1999 || Kitt Peak || Spacewatch || — || align=right | 4.8 km || 
|-id=338 bgcolor=#fefefe
| 150338 ||  || — || December 5, 1999 || Višnjan Observatory || K. Korlević || FLO || align=right | 1.5 km || 
|-id=339 bgcolor=#d6d6d6
| 150339 ||  || — || December 6, 1999 || Socorro || LINEAR || — || align=right | 9.0 km || 
|-id=340 bgcolor=#FA8072
| 150340 ||  || — || December 6, 1999 || Socorro || LINEAR || — || align=right | 1.8 km || 
|-id=341 bgcolor=#fefefe
| 150341 ||  || — || December 7, 1999 || Socorro || LINEAR || FLO || align=right | 1.8 km || 
|-id=342 bgcolor=#fefefe
| 150342 ||  || — || December 7, 1999 || Socorro || LINEAR || FLO || align=right | 1.3 km || 
|-id=343 bgcolor=#fefefe
| 150343 ||  || — || December 7, 1999 || Socorro || LINEAR || FLO || align=right | 1.7 km || 
|-id=344 bgcolor=#fefefe
| 150344 ||  || — || December 4, 1999 || Catalina || CSS || — || align=right | 2.1 km || 
|-id=345 bgcolor=#fefefe
| 150345 ||  || — || December 12, 1999 || Socorro || LINEAR || — || align=right | 1.4 km || 
|-id=346 bgcolor=#fefefe
| 150346 ||  || — || December 28, 1999 || Prescott || P. G. Comba || — || align=right | 1.3 km || 
|-id=347 bgcolor=#fefefe
| 150347 ||  || — || December 27, 1999 || Kitt Peak || Spacewatch || — || align=right | 1.0 km || 
|-id=348 bgcolor=#fefefe
| 150348 ||  || — || December 31, 1999 || Kitt Peak || Spacewatch || FLO || align=right data-sort-value="0.81" | 810 m || 
|-id=349 bgcolor=#fefefe
| 150349 ||  || — || December 16, 1999 || Kitt Peak || Spacewatch || — || align=right | 1.3 km || 
|-id=350 bgcolor=#fefefe
| 150350 ||  || — || January 2, 2000 || Socorro || LINEAR || FLO || align=right | 2.1 km || 
|-id=351 bgcolor=#fefefe
| 150351 ||  || — || January 3, 2000 || Socorro || LINEAR || FLO || align=right | 1.4 km || 
|-id=352 bgcolor=#fefefe
| 150352 ||  || — || January 3, 2000 || Socorro || LINEAR || — || align=right | 1.3 km || 
|-id=353 bgcolor=#fefefe
| 150353 ||  || — || January 3, 2000 || Socorro || LINEAR || — || align=right | 1.1 km || 
|-id=354 bgcolor=#fefefe
| 150354 ||  || — || January 3, 2000 || Socorro || LINEAR || FLO || align=right | 2.0 km || 
|-id=355 bgcolor=#fefefe
| 150355 ||  || — || January 4, 2000 || Socorro || LINEAR || V || align=right data-sort-value="0.95" | 950 m || 
|-id=356 bgcolor=#fefefe
| 150356 ||  || — || January 6, 2000 || Socorro || LINEAR || FLO || align=right data-sort-value="0.86" | 860 m || 
|-id=357 bgcolor=#fefefe
| 150357 ||  || — || January 3, 2000 || Socorro || LINEAR || FLO || align=right | 1.9 km || 
|-id=358 bgcolor=#fefefe
| 150358 ||  || — || January 4, 2000 || Kitt Peak || Spacewatch || FLO || align=right | 1.6 km || 
|-id=359 bgcolor=#fefefe
| 150359 ||  || — || January 3, 2000 || Kitt Peak || Spacewatch || — || align=right | 1.4 km || 
|-id=360 bgcolor=#fefefe
| 150360 ||  || — || January 26, 2000 || Kitt Peak || Spacewatch || — || align=right | 2.4 km || 
|-id=361 bgcolor=#fefefe
| 150361 ||  || — || January 29, 2000 || Kitt Peak || Spacewatch || NYS || align=right | 1.8 km || 
|-id=362 bgcolor=#E9E9E9
| 150362 ||  || — || January 29, 2000 || Kitt Peak || Spacewatch || — || align=right | 1.2 km || 
|-id=363 bgcolor=#fefefe
| 150363 ||  || — || January 29, 2000 || Kitt Peak || Spacewatch || V || align=right | 1.1 km || 
|-id=364 bgcolor=#fefefe
| 150364 ||  || — || February 2, 2000 || Socorro || LINEAR || — || align=right | 1.3 km || 
|-id=365 bgcolor=#fefefe
| 150365 ||  || — || February 2, 2000 || Socorro || LINEAR || — || align=right | 1.4 km || 
|-id=366 bgcolor=#fefefe
| 150366 ||  || — || February 2, 2000 || Socorro || LINEAR || — || align=right | 1.4 km || 
|-id=367 bgcolor=#fefefe
| 150367 ||  || — || February 2, 2000 || Socorro || LINEAR || FLO || align=right | 1.5 km || 
|-id=368 bgcolor=#fefefe
| 150368 ||  || — || February 2, 2000 || Socorro || LINEAR || FLO || align=right | 1.0 km || 
|-id=369 bgcolor=#fefefe
| 150369 ||  || — || February 2, 2000 || Socorro || LINEAR || PHO || align=right | 2.3 km || 
|-id=370 bgcolor=#E9E9E9
| 150370 ||  || — || February 3, 2000 || Socorro || LINEAR || — || align=right | 2.7 km || 
|-id=371 bgcolor=#fefefe
| 150371 ||  || — || February 7, 2000 || Kitt Peak || Spacewatch || — || align=right | 1.5 km || 
|-id=372 bgcolor=#fefefe
| 150372 ||  || — || February 5, 2000 || Višnjan Observatory || K. Korlević || — || align=right | 1.5 km || 
|-id=373 bgcolor=#fefefe
| 150373 ||  || — || February 7, 2000 || Kitt Peak || Spacewatch || — || align=right | 1.2 km || 
|-id=374 bgcolor=#fefefe
| 150374 Jasoncook ||  ||  || February 5, 2000 || Kitt Peak || M. W. Buie || MAS || align=right | 1.0 km || 
|-id=375 bgcolor=#fefefe
| 150375 ||  || — || February 3, 2000 || Socorro || LINEAR || FLO || align=right | 1.1 km || 
|-id=376 bgcolor=#fefefe
| 150376 ||  || — || February 28, 2000 || Socorro || LINEAR || NYS || align=right data-sort-value="0.89" | 890 m || 
|-id=377 bgcolor=#fefefe
| 150377 ||  || — || February 25, 2000 || Catalina || CSS || — || align=right | 1.5 km || 
|-id=378 bgcolor=#fefefe
| 150378 ||  || — || February 29, 2000 || Socorro || LINEAR || — || align=right | 1.9 km || 
|-id=379 bgcolor=#fefefe
| 150379 ||  || — || February 29, 2000 || Socorro || LINEAR || FLO || align=right | 1.1 km || 
|-id=380 bgcolor=#fefefe
| 150380 ||  || — || February 29, 2000 || Socorro || LINEAR || — || align=right | 1.2 km || 
|-id=381 bgcolor=#fefefe
| 150381 ||  || — || February 29, 2000 || Socorro || LINEAR || — || align=right | 1.3 km || 
|-id=382 bgcolor=#fefefe
| 150382 ||  || — || February 29, 2000 || Socorro || LINEAR || FLOfast? || align=right data-sort-value="0.98" | 980 m || 
|-id=383 bgcolor=#fefefe
| 150383 ||  || — || February 29, 2000 || Socorro || LINEAR || — || align=right | 1.2 km || 
|-id=384 bgcolor=#fefefe
| 150384 ||  || — || February 29, 2000 || Socorro || LINEAR || — || align=right | 1.1 km || 
|-id=385 bgcolor=#fefefe
| 150385 ||  || — || February 29, 2000 || Socorro || LINEAR || — || align=right | 1.5 km || 
|-id=386 bgcolor=#fefefe
| 150386 ||  || — || February 29, 2000 || Socorro || LINEAR || V || align=right | 1.3 km || 
|-id=387 bgcolor=#fefefe
| 150387 ||  || — || February 29, 2000 || Socorro || LINEAR || — || align=right | 1.6 km || 
|-id=388 bgcolor=#fefefe
| 150388 ||  || — || February 29, 2000 || Socorro || LINEAR || V || align=right | 1.2 km || 
|-id=389 bgcolor=#fefefe
| 150389 ||  || — || February 28, 2000 || Socorro || LINEAR || — || align=right | 2.3 km || 
|-id=390 bgcolor=#fefefe
| 150390 ||  || — || February 27, 2000 || Kitt Peak || Spacewatch || — || align=right | 1.4 km || 
|-id=391 bgcolor=#fefefe
| 150391 ||  || — || February 28, 2000 || Socorro || LINEAR || NYS || align=right | 1.0 km || 
|-id=392 bgcolor=#fefefe
| 150392 ||  || — || February 29, 2000 || Socorro || LINEAR || FLO || align=right | 1.2 km || 
|-id=393 bgcolor=#fefefe
| 150393 || 2000 EN || — || March 2, 2000 || Prescott || P. G. Comba || — || align=right | 1.6 km || 
|-id=394 bgcolor=#fefefe
| 150394 ||  || — || March 2, 2000 || Kitt Peak || Spacewatch || — || align=right | 2.3 km || 
|-id=395 bgcolor=#fefefe
| 150395 ||  || — || March 4, 2000 || Socorro || LINEAR || ERI || align=right | 2.7 km || 
|-id=396 bgcolor=#fefefe
| 150396 ||  || — || March 5, 2000 || Višnjan Observatory || K. Korlević || — || align=right | 1.8 km || 
|-id=397 bgcolor=#fefefe
| 150397 ||  || — || March 8, 2000 || Socorro || LINEAR || — || align=right | 1.3 km || 
|-id=398 bgcolor=#fefefe
| 150398 ||  || — || March 9, 2000 || Socorro || LINEAR || NYS || align=right | 1.2 km || 
|-id=399 bgcolor=#fefefe
| 150399 ||  || — || March 10, 2000 || Socorro || LINEAR || V || align=right | 1.1 km || 
|-id=400 bgcolor=#fefefe
| 150400 ||  || — || March 9, 2000 || Kitt Peak || Spacewatch || FLO || align=right | 1.1 km || 
|}

150401–150500 

|-bgcolor=#fefefe
| 150401 ||  || — || March 11, 2000 || Kitt Peak || Spacewatch || V || align=right | 1.1 km || 
|-id=402 bgcolor=#fefefe
| 150402 ||  || — || March 10, 2000 || Višnjan Observatory || K. Korlević || PHO || align=right | 1.2 km || 
|-id=403 bgcolor=#fefefe
| 150403 ||  || — || March 12, 2000 || Kitt Peak || Spacewatch || — || align=right | 1.9 km || 
|-id=404 bgcolor=#fefefe
| 150404 ||  || — || March 11, 2000 || Anderson Mesa || LONEOS || — || align=right | 1.8 km || 
|-id=405 bgcolor=#fefefe
| 150405 ||  || — || March 11, 2000 || Socorro || LINEAR || — || align=right | 1.1 km || 
|-id=406 bgcolor=#fefefe
| 150406 ||  || — || March 12, 2000 || Socorro || LINEAR || — || align=right | 2.1 km || 
|-id=407 bgcolor=#fefefe
| 150407 ||  || — || March 5, 2000 || Haleakala || NEAT || — || align=right | 2.3 km || 
|-id=408 bgcolor=#fefefe
| 150408 ||  || — || March 12, 2000 || Anderson Mesa || LONEOS || — || align=right | 3.1 km || 
|-id=409 bgcolor=#fefefe
| 150409 ||  || — || March 1, 2000 || Kitt Peak || Spacewatch || — || align=right | 1.4 km || 
|-id=410 bgcolor=#fefefe
| 150410 ||  || — || March 3, 2000 || Socorro || LINEAR || V || align=right | 1.1 km || 
|-id=411 bgcolor=#fefefe
| 150411 ||  || — || March 29, 2000 || Kitt Peak || Spacewatch || NYS || align=right data-sort-value="0.79" | 790 m || 
|-id=412 bgcolor=#fefefe
| 150412 ||  || — || March 29, 2000 || Socorro || LINEAR || V || align=right | 1.1 km || 
|-id=413 bgcolor=#fefefe
| 150413 ||  || — || March 29, 2000 || Socorro || LINEAR || — || align=right | 1.5 km || 
|-id=414 bgcolor=#fefefe
| 150414 ||  || — || March 29, 2000 || Socorro || LINEAR || — || align=right | 2.5 km || 
|-id=415 bgcolor=#fefefe
| 150415 ||  || — || March 27, 2000 || Anderson Mesa || LONEOS || — || align=right | 3.1 km || 
|-id=416 bgcolor=#d6d6d6
| 150416 ||  || — || March 29, 2000 || Kitt Peak || Spacewatch || 3:2 || align=right | 7.4 km || 
|-id=417 bgcolor=#fefefe
| 150417 ||  || — || March 29, 2000 || Socorro || LINEAR || V || align=right | 1.3 km || 
|-id=418 bgcolor=#fefefe
| 150418 ||  || — || March 29, 2000 || Socorro || LINEAR || NYS || align=right | 1.1 km || 
|-id=419 bgcolor=#fefefe
| 150419 || 2000 GX || — || April 2, 2000 || Kitt Peak || Spacewatch || — || align=right | 1.7 km || 
|-id=420 bgcolor=#fefefe
| 150420 ||  || — || April 4, 2000 || Socorro || LINEAR || — || align=right | 3.7 km || 
|-id=421 bgcolor=#fefefe
| 150421 ||  || — || April 5, 2000 || Socorro || LINEAR || NYS || align=right data-sort-value="0.99" | 990 m || 
|-id=422 bgcolor=#fefefe
| 150422 ||  || — || April 5, 2000 || Socorro || LINEAR || V || align=right data-sort-value="0.94" | 940 m || 
|-id=423 bgcolor=#fefefe
| 150423 ||  || — || April 5, 2000 || Socorro || LINEAR || MAS || align=right | 1.2 km || 
|-id=424 bgcolor=#fefefe
| 150424 ||  || — || April 5, 2000 || Socorro || LINEAR || — || align=right | 1.4 km || 
|-id=425 bgcolor=#fefefe
| 150425 ||  || — || April 5, 2000 || Socorro || LINEAR || NYS || align=right | 3.1 km || 
|-id=426 bgcolor=#fefefe
| 150426 ||  || — || April 5, 2000 || Socorro || LINEAR || NYS || align=right | 3.0 km || 
|-id=427 bgcolor=#fefefe
| 150427 ||  || — || April 5, 2000 || Socorro || LINEAR || — || align=right | 1.3 km || 
|-id=428 bgcolor=#fefefe
| 150428 ||  || — || April 5, 2000 || Socorro || LINEAR || MAS || align=right | 1.2 km || 
|-id=429 bgcolor=#fefefe
| 150429 ||  || — || April 5, 2000 || Socorro || LINEAR || — || align=right | 1.2 km || 
|-id=430 bgcolor=#fefefe
| 150430 ||  || — || April 5, 2000 || Socorro || LINEAR || MAS || align=right | 1.8 km || 
|-id=431 bgcolor=#fefefe
| 150431 ||  || — || April 5, 2000 || Socorro || LINEAR || NYS || align=right | 4.0 km || 
|-id=432 bgcolor=#fefefe
| 150432 ||  || — || April 5, 2000 || Socorro || LINEAR || — || align=right | 3.5 km || 
|-id=433 bgcolor=#E9E9E9
| 150433 ||  || — || April 5, 2000 || Socorro || LINEAR || — || align=right | 1.8 km || 
|-id=434 bgcolor=#fefefe
| 150434 ||  || — || April 3, 2000 || Socorro || LINEAR || FLO || align=right | 1.2 km || 
|-id=435 bgcolor=#fefefe
| 150435 ||  || — || April 7, 2000 || Socorro || LINEAR || — || align=right | 1.9 km || 
|-id=436 bgcolor=#fefefe
| 150436 ||  || — || April 7, 2000 || Socorro || LINEAR || V || align=right | 1.5 km || 
|-id=437 bgcolor=#fefefe
| 150437 ||  || — || April 7, 2000 || Socorro || LINEAR || NYS || align=right | 1.3 km || 
|-id=438 bgcolor=#fefefe
| 150438 ||  || — || April 2, 2000 || Kitt Peak || Spacewatch || NYSfast? || align=right data-sort-value="0.82" | 820 m || 
|-id=439 bgcolor=#fefefe
| 150439 ||  || — || April 2, 2000 || Kitt Peak || Spacewatch || NYS || align=right | 1.0 km || 
|-id=440 bgcolor=#fefefe
| 150440 ||  || — || April 3, 2000 || Kitt Peak || Spacewatch || NYS || align=right data-sort-value="0.92" | 920 m || 
|-id=441 bgcolor=#fefefe
| 150441 ||  || — || April 3, 2000 || Kitt Peak || Spacewatch || NYS || align=right data-sort-value="0.69" | 690 m || 
|-id=442 bgcolor=#fefefe
| 150442 ||  || — || April 10, 2000 || Haleakala || NEAT || — || align=right | 3.5 km || 
|-id=443 bgcolor=#fefefe
| 150443 ||  || — || April 4, 2000 || Anderson Mesa || LONEOS || — || align=right | 1.5 km || 
|-id=444 bgcolor=#fefefe
| 150444 ||  || — || April 12, 2000 || Kitt Peak || Spacewatch || V || align=right | 1.2 km || 
|-id=445 bgcolor=#fefefe
| 150445 ||  || — || April 7, 2000 || Anderson Mesa || LONEOS || — || align=right | 1.7 km || 
|-id=446 bgcolor=#fefefe
| 150446 ||  || — || April 5, 2000 || Socorro || LINEAR || V || align=right | 1.2 km || 
|-id=447 bgcolor=#fefefe
| 150447 ||  || — || April 3, 2000 || Socorro || LINEAR || — || align=right | 1.3 km || 
|-id=448 bgcolor=#fefefe
| 150448 ||  || — || April 2, 2000 || Kitt Peak || Spacewatch || MAS || align=right data-sort-value="0.95" | 950 m || 
|-id=449 bgcolor=#fefefe
| 150449 ||  || — || April 24, 2000 || Kitt Peak || Spacewatch || NYS || align=right data-sort-value="0.91" | 910 m || 
|-id=450 bgcolor=#fefefe
| 150450 ||  || — || April 25, 2000 || Kitt Peak || Spacewatch || V || align=right | 1.2 km || 
|-id=451 bgcolor=#fefefe
| 150451 ||  || — || April 27, 2000 || Socorro || LINEAR || — || align=right | 1.5 km || 
|-id=452 bgcolor=#E9E9E9
| 150452 ||  || — || April 29, 2000 || Kitt Peak || Spacewatch || — || align=right | 1.5 km || 
|-id=453 bgcolor=#fefefe
| 150453 ||  || — || April 29, 2000 || Socorro || LINEAR || NYS || align=right | 1.2 km || 
|-id=454 bgcolor=#fefefe
| 150454 ||  || — || April 29, 2000 || Socorro || LINEAR || ERI || align=right | 3.9 km || 
|-id=455 bgcolor=#fefefe
| 150455 ||  || — || April 29, 2000 || Socorro || LINEAR || NYS || align=right | 1.1 km || 
|-id=456 bgcolor=#fefefe
| 150456 ||  || — || April 24, 2000 || Anderson Mesa || LONEOS || NYS || align=right | 1.0 km || 
|-id=457 bgcolor=#fefefe
| 150457 ||  || — || April 26, 2000 || Anderson Mesa || LONEOS || NYS || align=right | 1.1 km || 
|-id=458 bgcolor=#fefefe
| 150458 ||  || — || April 28, 2000 || Kitt Peak || Spacewatch || EUT || align=right data-sort-value="0.97" | 970 m || 
|-id=459 bgcolor=#fefefe
| 150459 ||  || — || April 29, 2000 || Socorro || LINEAR || FLO || align=right | 1.2 km || 
|-id=460 bgcolor=#fefefe
| 150460 ||  || — || April 27, 2000 || Socorro || LINEAR || — || align=right | 1.6 km || 
|-id=461 bgcolor=#fefefe
| 150461 ||  || — || April 29, 2000 || Socorro || LINEAR || MAS || align=right | 1.2 km || 
|-id=462 bgcolor=#fefefe
| 150462 ||  || — || May 2, 2000 || Socorro || LINEAR || V || align=right | 1.2 km || 
|-id=463 bgcolor=#fefefe
| 150463 ||  || — || May 1, 2000 || Socorro || LINEAR || ERI || align=right | 2.6 km || 
|-id=464 bgcolor=#fefefe
| 150464 ||  || — || May 3, 2000 || Socorro || LINEAR || NYS || align=right | 1.2 km || 
|-id=465 bgcolor=#fefefe
| 150465 ||  || — || May 5, 2000 || Socorro || LINEAR || V || align=right | 1.2 km || 
|-id=466 bgcolor=#fefefe
| 150466 ||  || — || May 7, 2000 || Socorro || LINEAR || MAS || align=right | 1.2 km || 
|-id=467 bgcolor=#fefefe
| 150467 ||  || — || May 10, 2000 || Socorro || LINEAR || — || align=right | 1.2 km || 
|-id=468 bgcolor=#fefefe
| 150468 ||  || — || May 5, 2000 || Socorro || LINEAR || — || align=right | 1.3 km || 
|-id=469 bgcolor=#fefefe
| 150469 ||  || — || May 27, 2000 || Socorro || LINEAR || — || align=right | 2.5 km || 
|-id=470 bgcolor=#fefefe
| 150470 ||  || — || May 28, 2000 || Socorro || LINEAR || — || align=right | 1.9 km || 
|-id=471 bgcolor=#fefefe
| 150471 ||  || — || May 27, 2000 || Socorro || LINEAR || — || align=right | 1.7 km || 
|-id=472 bgcolor=#E9E9E9
| 150472 ||  || — || May 28, 2000 || Anderson Mesa || LONEOS || — || align=right | 2.6 km || 
|-id=473 bgcolor=#fefefe
| 150473 ||  || — || May 24, 2000 || Anderson Mesa || LONEOS || — || align=right | 1.7 km || 
|-id=474 bgcolor=#fefefe
| 150474 ||  || — || June 4, 2000 || Socorro || LINEAR || — || align=right | 1.6 km || 
|-id=475 bgcolor=#E9E9E9
| 150475 ||  || — || July 5, 2000 || Anderson Mesa || LONEOS || — || align=right | 4.9 km || 
|-id=476 bgcolor=#E9E9E9
| 150476 ||  || — || July 7, 2000 || Socorro || LINEAR || — || align=right | 2.1 km || 
|-id=477 bgcolor=#E9E9E9
| 150477 ||  || — || July 30, 2000 || Socorro || LINEAR || — || align=right | 3.4 km || 
|-id=478 bgcolor=#E9E9E9
| 150478 ||  || — || July 23, 2000 || Socorro || LINEAR || — || align=right | 1.7 km || 
|-id=479 bgcolor=#E9E9E9
| 150479 ||  || — || July 30, 2000 || Socorro || LINEAR || DOR || align=right | 7.6 km || 
|-id=480 bgcolor=#E9E9E9
| 150480 ||  || — || July 31, 2000 || Socorro || LINEAR || — || align=right | 2.3 km || 
|-id=481 bgcolor=#E9E9E9
| 150481 ||  || — || July 29, 2000 || Anderson Mesa || LONEOS || — || align=right | 3.6 km || 
|-id=482 bgcolor=#fefefe
| 150482 ||  || — || August 3, 2000 || Socorro || LINEAR || PHO || align=right | 2.2 km || 
|-id=483 bgcolor=#fefefe
| 150483 ||  || — || August 3, 2000 || Bisei SG Center || BATTeRS || H || align=right | 1.2 km || 
|-id=484 bgcolor=#E9E9E9
| 150484 ||  || — || August 1, 2000 || Socorro || LINEAR || GEF || align=right | 2.6 km || 
|-id=485 bgcolor=#fefefe
| 150485 ||  || — || August 24, 2000 || Socorro || LINEAR || H || align=right | 1.2 km || 
|-id=486 bgcolor=#d6d6d6
| 150486 ||  || — || August 24, 2000 || Socorro || LINEAR || TRP || align=right | 4.6 km || 
|-id=487 bgcolor=#E9E9E9
| 150487 ||  || — || August 24, 2000 || Socorro || LINEAR || — || align=right | 3.6 km || 
|-id=488 bgcolor=#E9E9E9
| 150488 ||  || — || August 24, 2000 || Socorro || LINEAR || — || align=right | 3.8 km || 
|-id=489 bgcolor=#E9E9E9
| 150489 ||  || — || August 24, 2000 || Socorro || LINEAR || — || align=right | 2.9 km || 
|-id=490 bgcolor=#E9E9E9
| 150490 ||  || — || August 24, 2000 || Socorro || LINEAR || — || align=right | 2.1 km || 
|-id=491 bgcolor=#E9E9E9
| 150491 ||  || — || August 24, 2000 || Socorro || LINEAR || — || align=right | 4.1 km || 
|-id=492 bgcolor=#E9E9E9
| 150492 ||  || — || August 26, 2000 || Prescott || P. G. Comba || — || align=right | 2.8 km || 
|-id=493 bgcolor=#E9E9E9
| 150493 ||  || — || August 24, 2000 || Socorro || LINEAR || — || align=right | 4.4 km || 
|-id=494 bgcolor=#E9E9E9
| 150494 ||  || — || August 24, 2000 || Socorro || LINEAR || — || align=right | 1.5 km || 
|-id=495 bgcolor=#E9E9E9
| 150495 ||  || — || August 25, 2000 || Socorro || LINEAR || — || align=right | 3.9 km || 
|-id=496 bgcolor=#E9E9E9
| 150496 ||  || — || August 26, 2000 || Socorro || LINEAR || GEF || align=right | 2.3 km || 
|-id=497 bgcolor=#E9E9E9
| 150497 ||  || — || August 28, 2000 || Socorro || LINEAR || — || align=right | 4.6 km || 
|-id=498 bgcolor=#E9E9E9
| 150498 ||  || — || August 24, 2000 || Socorro || LINEAR || — || align=right | 3.9 km || 
|-id=499 bgcolor=#E9E9E9
| 150499 ||  || — || August 29, 2000 || Črni Vrh || Črni Vrh || — || align=right | 3.4 km || 
|-id=500 bgcolor=#E9E9E9
| 150500 ||  || — || August 31, 2000 || Socorro || LINEAR || — || align=right | 3.3 km || 
|}

150501–150600 

|-bgcolor=#E9E9E9
| 150501 ||  || — || August 31, 2000 || Socorro || LINEAR || — || align=right | 3.8 km || 
|-id=502 bgcolor=#d6d6d6
| 150502 ||  || — || August 31, 2000 || Socorro || LINEAR || — || align=right | 4.9 km || 
|-id=503 bgcolor=#E9E9E9
| 150503 ||  || — || August 31, 2000 || Socorro || LINEAR || — || align=right | 3.8 km || 
|-id=504 bgcolor=#E9E9E9
| 150504 ||  || — || August 26, 2000 || Socorro || LINEAR || EUN || align=right | 2.3 km || 
|-id=505 bgcolor=#E9E9E9
| 150505 ||  || — || August 29, 2000 || Socorro || LINEAR || GEF || align=right | 2.2 km || 
|-id=506 bgcolor=#E9E9E9
| 150506 ||  || — || August 29, 2000 || Socorro || LINEAR || HOF || align=right | 5.2 km || 
|-id=507 bgcolor=#E9E9E9
| 150507 ||  || — || August 31, 2000 || Socorro || LINEAR || — || align=right | 4.7 km || 
|-id=508 bgcolor=#E9E9E9
| 150508 ||  || — || August 21, 2000 || Anderson Mesa || LONEOS || — || align=right | 3.8 km || 
|-id=509 bgcolor=#E9E9E9
| 150509 ||  || — || August 27, 2000 || Cerro Tololo || M. W. Buie || — || align=right | 2.1 km || 
|-id=510 bgcolor=#d6d6d6
| 150510 ||  || — || August 28, 2000 || Cerro Tololo || M. W. Buie || KOR || align=right | 2.3 km || 
|-id=511 bgcolor=#E9E9E9
| 150511 ||  || — || August 29, 2000 || La Silla || C. Barbieri || — || align=right | 2.6 km || 
|-id=512 bgcolor=#E9E9E9
| 150512 ||  || — || August 21, 2000 || Anderson Mesa || LONEOS || — || align=right | 3.6 km || 
|-id=513 bgcolor=#E9E9E9
| 150513 ||  || — || September 1, 2000 || Socorro || LINEAR || EUN || align=right | 2.4 km || 
|-id=514 bgcolor=#d6d6d6
| 150514 ||  || — || September 1, 2000 || Socorro || LINEAR || 628 || align=right | 4.0 km || 
|-id=515 bgcolor=#E9E9E9
| 150515 ||  || — || September 1, 2000 || Socorro || LINEAR || — || align=right | 4.3 km || 
|-id=516 bgcolor=#E9E9E9
| 150516 ||  || — || September 1, 2000 || Socorro || LINEAR || — || align=right | 5.1 km || 
|-id=517 bgcolor=#d6d6d6
| 150517 ||  || — || September 1, 2000 || Socorro || LINEAR || — || align=right | 3.5 km || 
|-id=518 bgcolor=#E9E9E9
| 150518 ||  || — || September 2, 2000 || Anderson Mesa || LONEOS || — || align=right | 4.4 km || 
|-id=519 bgcolor=#E9E9E9
| 150519 ||  || — || September 3, 2000 || Socorro || LINEAR || RAF || align=right | 1.6 km || 
|-id=520 bgcolor=#E9E9E9
| 150520 Dong ||  ||  || September 3, 2000 || Apache Point || SDSS || — || align=right | 3.0 km || 
|-id=521 bgcolor=#fefefe
| 150521 ||  || — || September 18, 2000 || Socorro || LINEAR || H || align=right | 1.6 km || 
|-id=522 bgcolor=#E9E9E9
| 150522 ||  || — || September 23, 2000 || Socorro || LINEAR || — || align=right | 4.1 km || 
|-id=523 bgcolor=#E9E9E9
| 150523 ||  || — || September 23, 2000 || Socorro || LINEAR || GEF || align=right | 1.7 km || 
|-id=524 bgcolor=#fefefe
| 150524 ||  || — || September 24, 2000 || Socorro || LINEAR || H || align=right data-sort-value="0.95" | 950 m || 
|-id=525 bgcolor=#d6d6d6
| 150525 ||  || — || September 24, 2000 || Socorro || LINEAR || — || align=right | 4.6 km || 
|-id=526 bgcolor=#fefefe
| 150526 ||  || — || September 22, 2000 || Socorro || LINEAR || H || align=right | 1.4 km || 
|-id=527 bgcolor=#E9E9E9
| 150527 ||  || — || September 22, 2000 || Socorro || LINEAR || — || align=right | 3.7 km || 
|-id=528 bgcolor=#E9E9E9
| 150528 ||  || — || September 23, 2000 || Socorro || LINEAR || AER || align=right | 2.7 km || 
|-id=529 bgcolor=#E9E9E9
| 150529 ||  || — || September 23, 2000 || Socorro || LINEAR || — || align=right | 3.4 km || 
|-id=530 bgcolor=#E9E9E9
| 150530 ||  || — || September 23, 2000 || Socorro || LINEAR || HEN || align=right | 1.8 km || 
|-id=531 bgcolor=#E9E9E9
| 150531 ||  || — || September 23, 2000 || Socorro || LINEAR || — || align=right | 3.4 km || 
|-id=532 bgcolor=#E9E9E9
| 150532 ||  || — || September 24, 2000 || Socorro || LINEAR || MRX || align=right | 1.6 km || 
|-id=533 bgcolor=#d6d6d6
| 150533 ||  || — || September 24, 2000 || Socorro || LINEAR || KOR || align=right | 2.2 km || 
|-id=534 bgcolor=#E9E9E9
| 150534 ||  || — || September 24, 2000 || Socorro || LINEAR || HOF || align=right | 4.5 km || 
|-id=535 bgcolor=#E9E9E9
| 150535 ||  || — || September 24, 2000 || Socorro || LINEAR || — || align=right | 3.7 km || 
|-id=536 bgcolor=#E9E9E9
| 150536 ||  || — || September 24, 2000 || Socorro || LINEAR || MIT || align=right | 4.8 km || 
|-id=537 bgcolor=#E9E9E9
| 150537 ||  || — || September 24, 2000 || Socorro || LINEAR || — || align=right | 3.6 km || 
|-id=538 bgcolor=#E9E9E9
| 150538 ||  || — || September 24, 2000 || Socorro || LINEAR || — || align=right | 3.9 km || 
|-id=539 bgcolor=#d6d6d6
| 150539 ||  || — || September 24, 2000 || Socorro || LINEAR || — || align=right | 3.7 km || 
|-id=540 bgcolor=#E9E9E9
| 150540 ||  || — || September 23, 2000 || Socorro || LINEAR || GEF || align=right | 2.2 km || 
|-id=541 bgcolor=#d6d6d6
| 150541 ||  || — || September 23, 2000 || Socorro || LINEAR || — || align=right | 5.4 km || 
|-id=542 bgcolor=#d6d6d6
| 150542 ||  || — || September 27, 2000 || Socorro || LINEAR || HYG || align=right | 3.3 km || 
|-id=543 bgcolor=#E9E9E9
| 150543 ||  || — || September 20, 2000 || Haleakala || NEAT || — || align=right | 3.3 km || 
|-id=544 bgcolor=#fefefe
| 150544 ||  || — || September 25, 2000 || Socorro || LINEAR || H || align=right | 1.1 km || 
|-id=545 bgcolor=#E9E9E9
| 150545 ||  || — || September 23, 2000 || Socorro || LINEAR || ADE || align=right | 5.2 km || 
|-id=546 bgcolor=#d6d6d6
| 150546 ||  || — || September 23, 2000 || Socorro || LINEAR || — || align=right | 2.8 km || 
|-id=547 bgcolor=#E9E9E9
| 150547 ||  || — || September 28, 2000 || Socorro || LINEAR || — || align=right | 3.7 km || 
|-id=548 bgcolor=#E9E9E9
| 150548 ||  || — || September 28, 2000 || Socorro || LINEAR || — || align=right | 2.9 km || 
|-id=549 bgcolor=#E9E9E9
| 150549 ||  || — || September 19, 2000 || Haleakala || NEAT || — || align=right | 1.8 km || 
|-id=550 bgcolor=#d6d6d6
| 150550 ||  || — || September 20, 2000 || Kitt Peak || Spacewatch || — || align=right | 4.4 km || 
|-id=551 bgcolor=#E9E9E9
| 150551 ||  || — || September 24, 2000 || Socorro || LINEAR || — || align=right | 1.4 km || 
|-id=552 bgcolor=#E9E9E9
| 150552 ||  || — || September 24, 2000 || Socorro || LINEAR || — || align=right | 2.9 km || 
|-id=553 bgcolor=#E9E9E9
| 150553 ||  || — || September 24, 2000 || Socorro || LINEAR || — || align=right | 1.7 km || 
|-id=554 bgcolor=#d6d6d6
| 150554 ||  || — || September 24, 2000 || Socorro || LINEAR || — || align=right | 6.3 km || 
|-id=555 bgcolor=#E9E9E9
| 150555 ||  || — || September 24, 2000 || Socorro || LINEAR || XIZ || align=right | 2.6 km || 
|-id=556 bgcolor=#E9E9E9
| 150556 ||  || — || September 24, 2000 || Socorro || LINEAR || — || align=right | 3.6 km || 
|-id=557 bgcolor=#E9E9E9
| 150557 ||  || — || September 26, 2000 || Socorro || LINEAR || AGN || align=right | 2.1 km || 
|-id=558 bgcolor=#E9E9E9
| 150558 ||  || — || September 24, 2000 || Socorro || LINEAR || — || align=right | 1.7 km || 
|-id=559 bgcolor=#E9E9E9
| 150559 ||  || — || September 24, 2000 || Socorro || LINEAR || — || align=right | 3.8 km || 
|-id=560 bgcolor=#E9E9E9
| 150560 ||  || — || September 24, 2000 || Socorro || LINEAR || NEM || align=right | 4.4 km || 
|-id=561 bgcolor=#d6d6d6
| 150561 ||  || — || September 24, 2000 || Socorro || LINEAR || 615 || align=right | 2.4 km || 
|-id=562 bgcolor=#E9E9E9
| 150562 ||  || — || September 24, 2000 || Socorro || LINEAR || RAF || align=right | 1.5 km || 
|-id=563 bgcolor=#E9E9E9
| 150563 ||  || — || September 30, 2000 || Socorro || LINEAR || — || align=right | 5.7 km || 
|-id=564 bgcolor=#d6d6d6
| 150564 ||  || — || September 23, 2000 || Socorro || LINEAR || — || align=right | 4.8 km || 
|-id=565 bgcolor=#d6d6d6
| 150565 ||  || — || September 30, 2000 || Socorro || LINEAR || — || align=right | 4.7 km || 
|-id=566 bgcolor=#E9E9E9
| 150566 ||  || — || September 27, 2000 || Socorro || LINEAR || — || align=right | 2.9 km || 
|-id=567 bgcolor=#E9E9E9
| 150567 ||  || — || September 26, 2000 || Haleakala || NEAT || — || align=right | 4.0 km || 
|-id=568 bgcolor=#E9E9E9
| 150568 ||  || — || September 24, 2000 || Socorro || LINEAR || PAD || align=right | 2.7 km || 
|-id=569 bgcolor=#E9E9E9
| 150569 ||  || — || September 30, 2000 || Anderson Mesa || LONEOS || GEF || align=right | 2.2 km || 
|-id=570 bgcolor=#E9E9E9
| 150570 ||  || — || September 30, 2000 || Anderson Mesa || LONEOS || — || align=right | 3.4 km || 
|-id=571 bgcolor=#E9E9E9
| 150571 ||  || — || September 21, 2000 || Anderson Mesa || LONEOS || WIT || align=right | 1.7 km || 
|-id=572 bgcolor=#d6d6d6
| 150572 ||  || — || October 1, 2000 || Socorro || LINEAR || DUR || align=right | 5.4 km || 
|-id=573 bgcolor=#E9E9E9
| 150573 ||  || — || October 6, 2000 || Anderson Mesa || LONEOS || — || align=right | 4.0 km || 
|-id=574 bgcolor=#d6d6d6
| 150574 ||  || — || October 6, 2000 || Anderson Mesa || LONEOS || KOR || align=right | 2.2 km || 
|-id=575 bgcolor=#E9E9E9
| 150575 ||  || — || October 1, 2000 || Anderson Mesa || LONEOS || GEF || align=right | 1.9 km || 
|-id=576 bgcolor=#E9E9E9
| 150576 ||  || — || October 1, 2000 || Socorro || LINEAR || — || align=right | 5.6 km || 
|-id=577 bgcolor=#d6d6d6
| 150577 ||  || — || October 26, 2000 || Socorro || LINEAR || EUP || align=right | 6.8 km || 
|-id=578 bgcolor=#d6d6d6
| 150578 ||  || — || October 24, 2000 || Socorro || LINEAR || KOR || align=right | 2.5 km || 
|-id=579 bgcolor=#d6d6d6
| 150579 ||  || — || October 24, 2000 || Socorro || LINEAR || — || align=right | 4.4 km || 
|-id=580 bgcolor=#d6d6d6
| 150580 ||  || — || October 24, 2000 || Socorro || LINEAR || — || align=right | 4.2 km || 
|-id=581 bgcolor=#d6d6d6
| 150581 ||  || — || October 25, 2000 || Socorro || LINEAR || EOS || align=right | 4.1 km || 
|-id=582 bgcolor=#d6d6d6
| 150582 ||  || — || October 25, 2000 || Socorro || LINEAR || — || align=right | 4.3 km || 
|-id=583 bgcolor=#d6d6d6
| 150583 ||  || — || October 31, 2000 || Socorro || LINEAR || NAE || align=right | 5.3 km || 
|-id=584 bgcolor=#E9E9E9
| 150584 ||  || — || November 1, 2000 || Socorro || LINEAR || — || align=right | 3.8 km || 
|-id=585 bgcolor=#d6d6d6
| 150585 ||  || — || November 22, 2000 || Bisei SG Center || BATTeRS || — || align=right | 6.2 km || 
|-id=586 bgcolor=#d6d6d6
| 150586 ||  || — || November 21, 2000 || Socorro || LINEAR || THM || align=right | 4.8 km || 
|-id=587 bgcolor=#d6d6d6
| 150587 ||  || — || November 21, 2000 || Socorro || LINEAR || — || align=right | 4.5 km || 
|-id=588 bgcolor=#d6d6d6
| 150588 ||  || — || November 25, 2000 || Socorro || LINEAR || THM || align=right | 5.4 km || 
|-id=589 bgcolor=#d6d6d6
| 150589 ||  || — || November 20, 2000 || Socorro || LINEAR || — || align=right | 5.4 km || 
|-id=590 bgcolor=#d6d6d6
| 150590 ||  || — || November 20, 2000 || Socorro || LINEAR || TIR || align=right | 4.9 km || 
|-id=591 bgcolor=#d6d6d6
| 150591 ||  || — || November 21, 2000 || Socorro || LINEAR || — || align=right | 7.3 km || 
|-id=592 bgcolor=#d6d6d6
| 150592 ||  || — || November 21, 2000 || Socorro || LINEAR || — || align=right | 5.8 km || 
|-id=593 bgcolor=#d6d6d6
| 150593 ||  || — || November 19, 2000 || Kitt Peak || Spacewatch || — || align=right | 5.2 km || 
|-id=594 bgcolor=#d6d6d6
| 150594 ||  || — || November 19, 2000 || Socorro || LINEAR || — || align=right | 6.3 km || 
|-id=595 bgcolor=#d6d6d6
| 150595 ||  || — || November 19, 2000 || Socorro || LINEAR || — || align=right | 3.9 km || 
|-id=596 bgcolor=#d6d6d6
| 150596 ||  || — || November 20, 2000 || Socorro || LINEAR || EOS || align=right | 3.3 km || 
|-id=597 bgcolor=#d6d6d6
| 150597 ||  || — || November 21, 2000 || Socorro || LINEAR || KOR || align=right | 2.4 km || 
|-id=598 bgcolor=#d6d6d6
| 150598 ||  || — || November 22, 2000 || Haleakala || NEAT || — || align=right | 4.7 km || 
|-id=599 bgcolor=#d6d6d6
| 150599 ||  || — || November 20, 2000 || Anderson Mesa || LONEOS || — || align=right | 5.1 km || 
|-id=600 bgcolor=#d6d6d6
| 150600 ||  || — || November 26, 2000 || Socorro || LINEAR || — || align=right | 5.6 km || 
|}

150601–150700 

|-bgcolor=#d6d6d6
| 150601 ||  || — || November 23, 2000 || Haleakala || NEAT || — || align=right | 4.2 km || 
|-id=602 bgcolor=#d6d6d6
| 150602 ||  || — || November 30, 2000 || Anderson Mesa || LONEOS || — || align=right | 5.8 km || 
|-id=603 bgcolor=#d6d6d6
| 150603 ||  || — || December 1, 2000 || Socorro || LINEAR || — || align=right | 5.5 km || 
|-id=604 bgcolor=#d6d6d6
| 150604 ||  || — || December 1, 2000 || Socorro || LINEAR || — || align=right | 6.8 km || 
|-id=605 bgcolor=#d6d6d6
| 150605 ||  || — || December 4, 2000 || Socorro || LINEAR || — || align=right | 3.9 km || 
|-id=606 bgcolor=#d6d6d6
| 150606 ||  || — || December 4, 2000 || Socorro || LINEAR || — || align=right | 5.1 km || 
|-id=607 bgcolor=#d6d6d6
| 150607 ||  || — || December 4, 2000 || Socorro || LINEAR || EOS || align=right | 3.9 km || 
|-id=608 bgcolor=#d6d6d6
| 150608 ||  || — || December 5, 2000 || Socorro || LINEAR || ALA || align=right | 6.9 km || 
|-id=609 bgcolor=#fefefe
| 150609 ||  || — || December 8, 2000 || Socorro || LINEAR || H || align=right | 2.3 km || 
|-id=610 bgcolor=#d6d6d6
| 150610 ||  || — || December 22, 2000 || Socorro || LINEAR || ALA || align=right | 5.4 km || 
|-id=611 bgcolor=#d6d6d6
| 150611 ||  || — || December 23, 2000 || Desert Beaver || W. K. Y. Yeung || — || align=right | 7.3 km || 
|-id=612 bgcolor=#d6d6d6
| 150612 ||  || — || December 30, 2000 || Socorro || LINEAR || — || align=right | 3.7 km || 
|-id=613 bgcolor=#d6d6d6
| 150613 ||  || — || December 30, 2000 || Socorro || LINEAR || — || align=right | 4.9 km || 
|-id=614 bgcolor=#d6d6d6
| 150614 ||  || — || December 30, 2000 || Socorro || LINEAR || — || align=right | 5.6 km || 
|-id=615 bgcolor=#d6d6d6
| 150615 ||  || — || December 30, 2000 || Socorro || LINEAR || — || align=right | 5.5 km || 
|-id=616 bgcolor=#d6d6d6
| 150616 ||  || — || December 30, 2000 || Socorro || LINEAR || — || align=right | 5.7 km || 
|-id=617 bgcolor=#d6d6d6
| 150617 ||  || — || December 30, 2000 || Socorro || LINEAR || THM || align=right | 4.5 km || 
|-id=618 bgcolor=#d6d6d6
| 150618 ||  || — || December 30, 2000 || Socorro || LINEAR || ALA || align=right | 7.6 km || 
|-id=619 bgcolor=#d6d6d6
| 150619 ||  || — || December 30, 2000 || Socorro || LINEAR || — || align=right | 5.8 km || 
|-id=620 bgcolor=#d6d6d6
| 150620 ||  || — || December 30, 2000 || Socorro || LINEAR || — || align=right | 5.1 km || 
|-id=621 bgcolor=#d6d6d6
| 150621 ||  || — || December 30, 2000 || Socorro || LINEAR || — || align=right | 5.5 km || 
|-id=622 bgcolor=#d6d6d6
| 150622 ||  || — || December 30, 2000 || Socorro || LINEAR || — || align=right | 5.9 km || 
|-id=623 bgcolor=#d6d6d6
| 150623 ||  || — || December 30, 2000 || Socorro || LINEAR || — || align=right | 5.6 km || 
|-id=624 bgcolor=#d6d6d6
| 150624 ||  || — || December 29, 2000 || Anderson Mesa || LONEOS || TIR || align=right | 5.2 km || 
|-id=625 bgcolor=#d6d6d6
| 150625 ||  || — || December 30, 2000 || Socorro || LINEAR || THM || align=right | 3.3 km || 
|-id=626 bgcolor=#d6d6d6
| 150626 ||  || — || January 2, 2001 || Socorro || LINEAR || TIR || align=right | 6.1 km || 
|-id=627 bgcolor=#d6d6d6
| 150627 ||  || — || January 5, 2001 || Socorro || LINEAR || — || align=right | 4.8 km || 
|-id=628 bgcolor=#d6d6d6
| 150628 ||  || — || January 4, 2001 || Socorro || LINEAR || — || align=right | 6.0 km || 
|-id=629 bgcolor=#d6d6d6
| 150629 ||  || — || January 3, 2001 || Anderson Mesa || LONEOS || EOS || align=right | 4.1 km || 
|-id=630 bgcolor=#d6d6d6
| 150630 ||  || — || January 15, 2001 || Socorro || LINEAR || — || align=right | 5.7 km || 
|-id=631 bgcolor=#d6d6d6
| 150631 ||  || — || January 15, 2001 || Bergisch Gladbach || W. Bickel || — || align=right | 4.8 km || 
|-id=632 bgcolor=#d6d6d6
| 150632 ||  || — || January 19, 2001 || Socorro || LINEAR || — || align=right | 5.2 km || 
|-id=633 bgcolor=#d6d6d6
| 150633 ||  || — || January 19, 2001 || Socorro || LINEAR || TIR || align=right | 5.7 km || 
|-id=634 bgcolor=#d6d6d6
| 150634 ||  || — || January 20, 2001 || Socorro || LINEAR || — || align=right | 7.0 km || 
|-id=635 bgcolor=#d6d6d6
| 150635 ||  || — || January 21, 2001 || Socorro || LINEAR || — || align=right | 3.9 km || 
|-id=636 bgcolor=#d6d6d6
| 150636 ||  || — || January 27, 2001 || Ondřejov || P. Kušnirák, P. Pravec || EUP || align=right | 7.6 km || 
|-id=637 bgcolor=#d6d6d6
| 150637 ||  || — || January 19, 2001 || Socorro || LINEAR || — || align=right | 4.9 km || 
|-id=638 bgcolor=#d6d6d6
| 150638 ||  || — || January 20, 2001 || Haleakala || NEAT || ALA || align=right | 5.0 km || 
|-id=639 bgcolor=#d6d6d6
| 150639 ||  || — || February 1, 2001 || Socorro || LINEAR || — || align=right | 5.9 km || 
|-id=640 bgcolor=#d6d6d6
| 150640 ||  || — || February 3, 2001 || Socorro || LINEAR || EUP || align=right | 11 km || 
|-id=641 bgcolor=#d6d6d6
| 150641 ||  || — || February 1, 2001 || Socorro || LINEAR || — || align=right | 6.1 km || 
|-id=642 bgcolor=#C2E0FF
| 150642 ||  || — || February 3, 2001 || Mauna Kea || C. Veillet || cubewano (hot) || align=right | 285 km || 
|-id=643 bgcolor=#d6d6d6
| 150643 ||  || — || February 13, 2001 || Socorro || LINEAR || MEL || align=right | 5.2 km || 
|-id=644 bgcolor=#fefefe
| 150644 ||  || — || February 17, 2001 || Socorro || LINEAR || — || align=right | 1.3 km || 
|-id=645 bgcolor=#d6d6d6
| 150645 ||  || — || February 19, 2001 || Socorro || LINEAR || — || align=right | 6.6 km || 
|-id=646 bgcolor=#fefefe
| 150646 ||  || — || February 19, 2001 || Socorro || LINEAR || — || align=right | 1.2 km || 
|-id=647 bgcolor=#d6d6d6
| 150647 ||  || — || February 19, 2001 || Socorro || LINEAR || 7:4 || align=right | 6.6 km || 
|-id=648 bgcolor=#d6d6d6
| 150648 ||  || — || February 19, 2001 || Socorro || LINEAR || THB || align=right | 6.1 km || 
|-id=649 bgcolor=#d6d6d6
| 150649 ||  || — || February 25, 2001 || Haleakala || NEAT || THB || align=right | 6.6 km || 
|-id=650 bgcolor=#d6d6d6
| 150650 ||  || — || February 20, 2001 || Socorro || LINEAR || THM || align=right | 3.7 km || 
|-id=651 bgcolor=#d6d6d6
| 150651 ||  || — || February 19, 2001 || Kitt Peak || Spacewatch || THM || align=right | 5.4 km || 
|-id=652 bgcolor=#d6d6d6
| 150652 ||  || — || February 17, 2001 || Socorro || LINEAR || EUP || align=right | 8.4 km || 
|-id=653 bgcolor=#d6d6d6
| 150653 ||  || — || February 16, 2001 || Socorro || LINEAR || — || align=right | 9.6 km || 
|-id=654 bgcolor=#d6d6d6
| 150654 ||  || — || February 16, 2001 || Anderson Mesa || LONEOS || — || align=right | 6.0 km || 
|-id=655 bgcolor=#d6d6d6
| 150655 ||  || — || March 1, 2001 || Socorro || LINEAR || — || align=right | 8.8 km || 
|-id=656 bgcolor=#d6d6d6
| 150656 ||  || — || March 2, 2001 || Anderson Mesa || LONEOS || — || align=right | 4.8 km || 
|-id=657 bgcolor=#fefefe
| 150657 ||  || — || March 15, 2001 || Anderson Mesa || LONEOS || FLO || align=right | 1.1 km || 
|-id=658 bgcolor=#d6d6d6
| 150658 ||  || — || March 18, 2001 || Socorro || LINEAR || EUP || align=right | 7.0 km || 
|-id=659 bgcolor=#fefefe
| 150659 ||  || — || March 19, 2001 || Socorro || LINEAR || — || align=right | 1.2 km || 
|-id=660 bgcolor=#fefefe
| 150660 ||  || — || March 18, 2001 || Socorro || LINEAR || — || align=right | 1.2 km || 
|-id=661 bgcolor=#d6d6d6
| 150661 ||  || — || March 16, 2001 || Socorro || LINEAR || — || align=right | 6.2 km || 
|-id=662 bgcolor=#fefefe
| 150662 ||  || — || April 29, 2001 || Socorro || LINEAR || — || align=right | 2.9 km || 
|-id=663 bgcolor=#fefefe
| 150663 ||  || — || May 14, 2001 || Kitt Peak || Spacewatch || — || align=right | 2.1 km || 
|-id=664 bgcolor=#fefefe
| 150664 ||  || — || May 21, 2001 || Kitt Peak || Spacewatch || — || align=right | 1.1 km || 
|-id=665 bgcolor=#fefefe
| 150665 ||  || — || May 17, 2001 || Socorro || LINEAR || — || align=right data-sort-value="0.94" | 940 m || 
|-id=666 bgcolor=#fefefe
| 150666 ||  || — || May 23, 2001 || Socorro || LINEAR || FLO || align=right data-sort-value="0.99" | 990 m || 
|-id=667 bgcolor=#fefefe
| 150667 ||  || — || May 30, 2001 || Socorro || LINEAR || PHO || align=right | 2.2 km || 
|-id=668 bgcolor=#E9E9E9
| 150668 ||  || — || June 17, 2001 || Palomar || NEAT || — || align=right | 2.1 km || 
|-id=669 bgcolor=#fefefe
| 150669 ||  || — || June 23, 2001 || Palomar || NEAT || — || align=right | 1.4 km || 
|-id=670 bgcolor=#E9E9E9
| 150670 ||  || — || June 28, 2001 || Anderson Mesa || LONEOS || — || align=right | 2.7 km || 
|-id=671 bgcolor=#fefefe
| 150671 ||  || — || June 26, 2001 || Palomar || NEAT || NYS || align=right | 1.3 km || 
|-id=672 bgcolor=#E9E9E9
| 150672 ||  || — || June 24, 2001 || Socorro || LINEAR || — || align=right | 2.0 km || 
|-id=673 bgcolor=#fefefe
| 150673 ||  || — || July 13, 2001 || Palomar || NEAT || CLA || align=right | 2.5 km || 
|-id=674 bgcolor=#fefefe
| 150674 ||  || — || July 13, 2001 || Haleakala || NEAT || — || align=right | 1.1 km || 
|-id=675 bgcolor=#fefefe
| 150675 ||  || — || July 14, 2001 || Palomar || NEAT || — || align=right | 1.2 km || 
|-id=676 bgcolor=#fefefe
| 150676 ||  || — || July 18, 2001 || Palomar || NEAT || V || align=right | 1.2 km || 
|-id=677 bgcolor=#fefefe
| 150677 ||  || — || July 17, 2001 || Anderson Mesa || LONEOS || — || align=right | 1.4 km || 
|-id=678 bgcolor=#E9E9E9
| 150678 ||  || — || July 20, 2001 || Anderson Mesa || LONEOS || — || align=right | 3.9 km || 
|-id=679 bgcolor=#fefefe
| 150679 ||  || — || July 19, 2001 || Palomar || NEAT || MAS || align=right | 1.1 km || 
|-id=680 bgcolor=#E9E9E9
| 150680 ||  || — || July 22, 2001 || Palomar || NEAT || — || align=right | 2.0 km || 
|-id=681 bgcolor=#fefefe
| 150681 ||  || — || July 16, 2001 || Haleakala || NEAT || FLO || align=right | 1.3 km || 
|-id=682 bgcolor=#E9E9E9
| 150682 ||  || — || July 17, 2001 || Palomar || NEAT || — || align=right | 1.6 km || 
|-id=683 bgcolor=#fefefe
| 150683 ||  || — || July 21, 2001 || Palomar || NEAT || V || align=right | 1.3 km || 
|-id=684 bgcolor=#fefefe
| 150684 ||  || — || July 21, 2001 || Haleakala || NEAT || — || align=right | 1.4 km || 
|-id=685 bgcolor=#fefefe
| 150685 ||  || — || July 20, 2001 || Anderson Mesa || LONEOS || FLO || align=right | 1.1 km || 
|-id=686 bgcolor=#fefefe
| 150686 ||  || — || July 20, 2001 || Anderson Mesa || LONEOS || V || align=right | 1.0 km || 
|-id=687 bgcolor=#fefefe
| 150687 ||  || — || July 28, 2001 || Reedy Creek || J. Broughton || — || align=right | 1.4 km || 
|-id=688 bgcolor=#fefefe
| 150688 ||  || — || July 26, 2001 || Haleakala || NEAT || NYS || align=right | 1.2 km || 
|-id=689 bgcolor=#E9E9E9
| 150689 ||  || — || July 19, 2001 || Anderson Mesa || LONEOS || — || align=right | 2.1 km || 
|-id=690 bgcolor=#fefefe
| 150690 ||  || — || July 29, 2001 || Reedy Creek || J. Broughton || — || align=right | 1.2 km || 
|-id=691 bgcolor=#E9E9E9
| 150691 ||  || — || July 29, 2001 || Palomar || NEAT || — || align=right | 2.3 km || 
|-id=692 bgcolor=#fefefe
| 150692 ||  || — || July 22, 2001 || Socorro || LINEAR || — || align=right | 1.7 km || 
|-id=693 bgcolor=#fefefe
| 150693 ||  || — || July 30, 2001 || Palomar || NEAT || NYS || align=right | 2.7 km || 
|-id=694 bgcolor=#fefefe
| 150694 ||  || — || July 24, 2001 || Palomar || NEAT || — || align=right | 1.9 km || 
|-id=695 bgcolor=#fefefe
| 150695 ||  || — || July 25, 2001 || Haleakala || NEAT || — || align=right | 1.4 km || 
|-id=696 bgcolor=#E9E9E9
| 150696 ||  || — || July 28, 2001 || Haleakala || NEAT || — || align=right | 1.8 km || 
|-id=697 bgcolor=#fefefe
| 150697 ||  || — || August 3, 2001 || Haleakala || NEAT || — || align=right | 1.1 km || 
|-id=698 bgcolor=#fefefe
| 150698 ||  || — || August 11, 2001 || Ondřejov || P. Kušnirák || — || align=right | 1.5 km || 
|-id=699 bgcolor=#fefefe
| 150699 ||  || — || August 11, 2001 || Haleakala || NEAT || — || align=right | 1.4 km || 
|-id=700 bgcolor=#fefefe
| 150700 ||  || — || August 10, 2001 || Palomar || NEAT || NYS || align=right | 1.1 km || 
|}

150701–150800 

|-bgcolor=#E9E9E9
| 150701 ||  || — || August 10, 2001 || Haleakala || NEAT || — || align=right | 1.3 km || 
|-id=702 bgcolor=#fefefe
| 150702 ||  || — || August 10, 2001 || Haleakala || NEAT || FLO || align=right | 1.1 km || 
|-id=703 bgcolor=#E9E9E9
| 150703 ||  || — || August 10, 2001 || Palomar || NEAT || — || align=right | 2.2 km || 
|-id=704 bgcolor=#fefefe
| 150704 ||  || — || August 11, 2001 || Palomar || NEAT || — || align=right | 2.8 km || 
|-id=705 bgcolor=#E9E9E9
| 150705 ||  || — || August 11, 2001 || Palomar || NEAT || — || align=right | 5.1 km || 
|-id=706 bgcolor=#E9E9E9
| 150706 ||  || — || August 14, 2001 || Haleakala || NEAT || — || align=right | 2.5 km || 
|-id=707 bgcolor=#fefefe
| 150707 ||  || — || August 11, 2001 || Haleakala || NEAT || V || align=right | 1.2 km || 
|-id=708 bgcolor=#fefefe
| 150708 ||  || — || August 14, 2001 || Haleakala || NEAT || V || align=right | 1.2 km || 
|-id=709 bgcolor=#fefefe
| 150709 ||  || — || August 13, 2001 || Haleakala || NEAT || — || align=right | 1.6 km || 
|-id=710 bgcolor=#fefefe
| 150710 ||  || — || August 13, 2001 || Haleakala || NEAT || NYS || align=right | 1.0 km || 
|-id=711 bgcolor=#fefefe
| 150711 ||  || — || August 13, 2001 || Haleakala || NEAT || FLO || align=right | 1.2 km || 
|-id=712 bgcolor=#fefefe
| 150712 || 2001 QD || — || August 16, 2001 || San Marcello || A. Boattini, L. Tesi || — || align=right | 1.1 km || 
|-id=713 bgcolor=#fefefe
| 150713 || 2001 QF || — || August 16, 2001 || San Marcello || L. Tesi, M. Tombelli || NYS || align=right | 1.0 km || 
|-id=714 bgcolor=#fefefe
| 150714 ||  || — || August 16, 2001 || Socorro || LINEAR || — || align=right | 1.7 km || 
|-id=715 bgcolor=#fefefe
| 150715 ||  || — || August 16, 2001 || Socorro || LINEAR || — || align=right | 1.7 km || 
|-id=716 bgcolor=#E9E9E9
| 150716 ||  || — || August 16, 2001 || Socorro || LINEAR || — || align=right | 1.4 km || 
|-id=717 bgcolor=#E9E9E9
| 150717 ||  || — || August 16, 2001 || Socorro || LINEAR || — || align=right | 1.8 km || 
|-id=718 bgcolor=#fefefe
| 150718 ||  || — || August 16, 2001 || Socorro || LINEAR || — || align=right | 3.2 km || 
|-id=719 bgcolor=#fefefe
| 150719 ||  || — || August 16, 2001 || Socorro || LINEAR || NYS || align=right | 1.0 km || 
|-id=720 bgcolor=#fefefe
| 150720 ||  || — || August 16, 2001 || Socorro || LINEAR || — || align=right | 1.5 km || 
|-id=721 bgcolor=#fefefe
| 150721 ||  || — || August 16, 2001 || Socorro || LINEAR || — || align=right | 1.7 km || 
|-id=722 bgcolor=#fefefe
| 150722 ||  || — || August 16, 2001 || Socorro || LINEAR || — || align=right | 2.0 km || 
|-id=723 bgcolor=#fefefe
| 150723 ||  || — || August 16, 2001 || Socorro || LINEAR || NYS || align=right | 1.4 km || 
|-id=724 bgcolor=#E9E9E9
| 150724 ||  || — || August 17, 2001 || Socorro || LINEAR || — || align=right | 3.7 km || 
|-id=725 bgcolor=#fefefe
| 150725 ||  || — || August 17, 2001 || Socorro || LINEAR || V || align=right | 1.3 km || 
|-id=726 bgcolor=#fefefe
| 150726 ||  || — || August 16, 2001 || Socorro || LINEAR || NYS || align=right data-sort-value="0.95" | 950 m || 
|-id=727 bgcolor=#fefefe
| 150727 ||  || — || August 16, 2001 || Socorro || LINEAR || MAS || align=right | 1.4 km || 
|-id=728 bgcolor=#fefefe
| 150728 ||  || — || August 16, 2001 || Socorro || LINEAR || MAS || align=right | 1.2 km || 
|-id=729 bgcolor=#fefefe
| 150729 ||  || — || August 16, 2001 || Socorro || LINEAR || EUT || align=right data-sort-value="0.98" | 980 m || 
|-id=730 bgcolor=#fefefe
| 150730 ||  || — || August 16, 2001 || Socorro || LINEAR || MAS || align=right | 1.2 km || 
|-id=731 bgcolor=#fefefe
| 150731 ||  || — || August 16, 2001 || Socorro || LINEAR || — || align=right | 1.3 km || 
|-id=732 bgcolor=#fefefe
| 150732 ||  || — || August 16, 2001 || Socorro || LINEAR || NYS || align=right | 1.0 km || 
|-id=733 bgcolor=#fefefe
| 150733 ||  || — || August 16, 2001 || Socorro || LINEAR || FLO || align=right data-sort-value="0.86" | 860 m || 
|-id=734 bgcolor=#E9E9E9
| 150734 ||  || — || August 16, 2001 || Socorro || LINEAR || — || align=right | 1.6 km || 
|-id=735 bgcolor=#E9E9E9
| 150735 ||  || — || August 16, 2001 || Socorro || LINEAR || — || align=right | 1.2 km || 
|-id=736 bgcolor=#E9E9E9
| 150736 ||  || — || August 16, 2001 || Socorro || LINEAR || — || align=right | 1.9 km || 
|-id=737 bgcolor=#fefefe
| 150737 ||  || — || August 16, 2001 || Socorro || LINEAR || NYS || align=right | 1.1 km || 
|-id=738 bgcolor=#E9E9E9
| 150738 ||  || — || August 16, 2001 || Socorro || LINEAR || — || align=right | 1.8 km || 
|-id=739 bgcolor=#E9E9E9
| 150739 ||  || — || August 18, 2001 || Socorro || LINEAR || — || align=right | 5.5 km || 
|-id=740 bgcolor=#E9E9E9
| 150740 ||  || — || August 17, 2001 || Socorro || LINEAR || RAF || align=right | 1.8 km || 
|-id=741 bgcolor=#fefefe
| 150741 ||  || — || August 19, 2001 || Socorro || LINEAR || V || align=right | 1.3 km || 
|-id=742 bgcolor=#E9E9E9
| 150742 ||  || — || August 22, 2001 || Desert Eagle || W. K. Y. Yeung || — || align=right | 1.9 km || 
|-id=743 bgcolor=#fefefe
| 150743 ||  || — || August 21, 2001 || Haleakala || NEAT || V || align=right | 1.5 km || 
|-id=744 bgcolor=#fefefe
| 150744 ||  || — || August 20, 2001 || Ondřejov || P. Pravec, P. Kušnirák || MAS || align=right | 1.1 km || 
|-id=745 bgcolor=#fefefe
| 150745 ||  || — || August 26, 2001 || Ondřejov || P. Pravec, P. Kušnirák || — || align=right | 1.7 km || 
|-id=746 bgcolor=#fefefe
| 150746 ||  || — || August 17, 2001 || Socorro || LINEAR || V || align=right | 1.3 km || 
|-id=747 bgcolor=#fefefe
| 150747 ||  || — || August 17, 2001 || Socorro || LINEAR || SVE || align=right | 4.9 km || 
|-id=748 bgcolor=#fefefe
| 150748 ||  || — || August 18, 2001 || Socorro || LINEAR || — || align=right | 1.4 km || 
|-id=749 bgcolor=#E9E9E9
| 150749 ||  || — || August 18, 2001 || Socorro || LINEAR || — || align=right | 1.9 km || 
|-id=750 bgcolor=#fefefe
| 150750 ||  || — || August 19, 2001 || Socorro || LINEAR || MAS || align=right | 1.2 km || 
|-id=751 bgcolor=#fefefe
| 150751 ||  || — || August 19, 2001 || Socorro || LINEAR || NYS || align=right | 1.2 km || 
|-id=752 bgcolor=#E9E9E9
| 150752 ||  || — || August 20, 2001 || Socorro || LINEAR || EUN || align=right | 1.9 km || 
|-id=753 bgcolor=#E9E9E9
| 150753 ||  || — || August 22, 2001 || Socorro || LINEAR || — || align=right | 1.5 km || 
|-id=754 bgcolor=#E9E9E9
| 150754 ||  || — || August 22, 2001 || Socorro || LINEAR || — || align=right | 1.7 km || 
|-id=755 bgcolor=#E9E9E9
| 150755 ||  || — || August 22, 2001 || Socorro || LINEAR || — || align=right | 2.2 km || 
|-id=756 bgcolor=#E9E9E9
| 150756 ||  || — || August 20, 2001 || Palomar || NEAT || — || align=right | 3.2 km || 
|-id=757 bgcolor=#d6d6d6
| 150757 ||  || — || August 23, 2001 || Anderson Mesa || LONEOS || — || align=right | 3.0 km || 
|-id=758 bgcolor=#E9E9E9
| 150758 ||  || — || August 23, 2001 || Anderson Mesa || LONEOS || — || align=right | 1.4 km || 
|-id=759 bgcolor=#fefefe
| 150759 ||  || — || August 23, 2001 || Anderson Mesa || LONEOS || — || align=right | 1.4 km || 
|-id=760 bgcolor=#fefefe
| 150760 ||  || — || August 23, 2001 || Anderson Mesa || LONEOS || — || align=right | 1.4 km || 
|-id=761 bgcolor=#E9E9E9
| 150761 ||  || — || August 25, 2001 || Palomar || NEAT || — || align=right | 3.5 km || 
|-id=762 bgcolor=#E9E9E9
| 150762 ||  || — || August 22, 2001 || Goodricke-Pigott || R. A. Tucker || — || align=right | 1.4 km || 
|-id=763 bgcolor=#E9E9E9
| 150763 ||  || — || August 22, 2001 || Kitt Peak || Spacewatch || — || align=right | 1.6 km || 
|-id=764 bgcolor=#fefefe
| 150764 ||  || — || August 23, 2001 || Anderson Mesa || LONEOS || FLO || align=right | 1.6 km || 
|-id=765 bgcolor=#fefefe
| 150765 ||  || — || August 23, 2001 || Desert Eagle || W. K. Y. Yeung || MAS || align=right data-sort-value="0.98" | 980 m || 
|-id=766 bgcolor=#fefefe
| 150766 ||  || — || August 23, 2001 || Anderson Mesa || LONEOS || — || align=right | 1.3 km || 
|-id=767 bgcolor=#fefefe
| 150767 ||  || — || August 23, 2001 || Anderson Mesa || LONEOS || — || align=right | 4.2 km || 
|-id=768 bgcolor=#fefefe
| 150768 ||  || — || August 23, 2001 || Anderson Mesa || LONEOS || NYS || align=right | 1.2 km || 
|-id=769 bgcolor=#fefefe
| 150769 ||  || — || August 24, 2001 || Desert Eagle || W. K. Y. Yeung || MAS || align=right | 1.5 km || 
|-id=770 bgcolor=#fefefe
| 150770 ||  || — || August 24, 2001 || Socorro || LINEAR || — || align=right | 1.5 km || 
|-id=771 bgcolor=#fefefe
| 150771 ||  || — || August 24, 2001 || Socorro || LINEAR || — || align=right | 1.6 km || 
|-id=772 bgcolor=#fefefe
| 150772 ||  || — || August 24, 2001 || Socorro || LINEAR || NYS || align=right | 1.2 km || 
|-id=773 bgcolor=#fefefe
| 150773 ||  || — || August 24, 2001 || Socorro || LINEAR || NYS || align=right data-sort-value="0.91" | 910 m || 
|-id=774 bgcolor=#fefefe
| 150774 ||  || — || August 24, 2001 || Socorro || LINEAR || V || align=right | 1.3 km || 
|-id=775 bgcolor=#E9E9E9
| 150775 ||  || — || August 24, 2001 || Socorro || LINEAR || — || align=right | 2.0 km || 
|-id=776 bgcolor=#E9E9E9
| 150776 ||  || — || August 25, 2001 || Socorro || LINEAR || JUN || align=right | 4.7 km || 
|-id=777 bgcolor=#E9E9E9
| 150777 ||  || — || August 25, 2001 || Anderson Mesa || LONEOS || — || align=right | 2.3 km || 
|-id=778 bgcolor=#fefefe
| 150778 ||  || — || August 20, 2001 || Socorro || LINEAR || V || align=right | 1.1 km || 
|-id=779 bgcolor=#E9E9E9
| 150779 ||  || — || August 20, 2001 || Palomar || NEAT || — || align=right | 2.6 km || 
|-id=780 bgcolor=#E9E9E9
| 150780 ||  || — || August 19, 2001 || Socorro || LINEAR || — || align=right | 3.9 km || 
|-id=781 bgcolor=#E9E9E9
| 150781 ||  || — || August 19, 2001 || Anderson Mesa || LONEOS || IAN || align=right | 2.3 km || 
|-id=782 bgcolor=#E9E9E9
| 150782 ||  || — || August 16, 2001 || Socorro || LINEAR || MAR || align=right | 2.3 km || 
|-id=783 bgcolor=#E9E9E9
| 150783 ||  || — || August 23, 2001 || Palomar || NEAT || MAR || align=right | 2.1 km || 
|-id=784 bgcolor=#E9E9E9
| 150784 ||  || — || September 9, 2001 || Socorro || LINEAR || HNS || align=right | 2.2 km || 
|-id=785 bgcolor=#fefefe
| 150785 ||  || — || September 7, 2001 || Socorro || LINEAR || — || align=right | 1.3 km || 
|-id=786 bgcolor=#fefefe
| 150786 ||  || — || September 7, 2001 || Socorro || LINEAR || FLO || align=right data-sort-value="0.94" | 940 m || 
|-id=787 bgcolor=#fefefe
| 150787 ||  || — || September 7, 2001 || Socorro || LINEAR || V || align=right | 1.3 km || 
|-id=788 bgcolor=#fefefe
| 150788 ||  || — || September 7, 2001 || Socorro || LINEAR || V || align=right | 1.1 km || 
|-id=789 bgcolor=#fefefe
| 150789 ||  || — || September 7, 2001 || Socorro || LINEAR || V || align=right | 1.2 km || 
|-id=790 bgcolor=#E9E9E9
| 150790 ||  || — || September 8, 2001 || Socorro || LINEAR || — || align=right | 1.8 km || 
|-id=791 bgcolor=#fefefe
| 150791 ||  || — || September 8, 2001 || Socorro || LINEAR || V || align=right | 1.3 km || 
|-id=792 bgcolor=#E9E9E9
| 150792 ||  || — || September 8, 2001 || Socorro || LINEAR || — || align=right | 1.8 km || 
|-id=793 bgcolor=#fefefe
| 150793 ||  || — || September 8, 2001 || Socorro || LINEAR || NYS || align=right data-sort-value="0.89" | 890 m || 
|-id=794 bgcolor=#E9E9E9
| 150794 ||  || — || September 9, 2001 || Palomar || NEAT || EUN || align=right | 1.7 km || 
|-id=795 bgcolor=#E9E9E9
| 150795 ||  || — || September 12, 2001 || Socorro || LINEAR || — || align=right | 1.5 km || 
|-id=796 bgcolor=#fefefe
| 150796 ||  || — || September 12, 2001 || Socorro || LINEAR || — || align=right | 1.6 km || 
|-id=797 bgcolor=#E9E9E9
| 150797 ||  || — || September 12, 2001 || Socorro || LINEAR || — || align=right | 2.3 km || 
|-id=798 bgcolor=#E9E9E9
| 150798 ||  || — || September 12, 2001 || Socorro || LINEAR || EUN || align=right | 1.8 km || 
|-id=799 bgcolor=#E9E9E9
| 150799 ||  || — || September 12, 2001 || Socorro || LINEAR || — || align=right | 1.6 km || 
|-id=800 bgcolor=#fefefe
| 150800 ||  || — || September 10, 2001 || Socorro || LINEAR || — || align=right | 2.0 km || 
|}

150801–150900 

|-bgcolor=#E9E9E9
| 150801 ||  || — || September 10, 2001 || Socorro || LINEAR || — || align=right | 4.1 km || 
|-id=802 bgcolor=#E9E9E9
| 150802 ||  || — || September 14, 2001 || Palomar || NEAT || — || align=right | 3.9 km || 
|-id=803 bgcolor=#fefefe
| 150803 ||  || — || September 11, 2001 || Anderson Mesa || LONEOS || — || align=right | 1.6 km || 
|-id=804 bgcolor=#E9E9E9
| 150804 ||  || — || September 11, 2001 || Anderson Mesa || LONEOS || — || align=right | 1.5 km || 
|-id=805 bgcolor=#fefefe
| 150805 ||  || — || September 11, 2001 || Anderson Mesa || LONEOS || — || align=right | 2.4 km || 
|-id=806 bgcolor=#fefefe
| 150806 ||  || — || September 11, 2001 || Anderson Mesa || LONEOS || MAS || align=right | 1.2 km || 
|-id=807 bgcolor=#fefefe
| 150807 ||  || — || September 11, 2001 || Kitt Peak || Spacewatch || CLA || align=right | 2.0 km || 
|-id=808 bgcolor=#fefefe
| 150808 ||  || — || September 12, 2001 || Socorro || LINEAR || V || align=right | 1.3 km || 
|-id=809 bgcolor=#E9E9E9
| 150809 ||  || — || September 12, 2001 || Socorro || LINEAR || — || align=right | 2.9 km || 
|-id=810 bgcolor=#fefefe
| 150810 ||  || — || September 12, 2001 || Socorro || LINEAR || V || align=right data-sort-value="0.98" | 980 m || 
|-id=811 bgcolor=#fefefe
| 150811 ||  || — || September 12, 2001 || Socorro || LINEAR || — || align=right | 2.6 km || 
|-id=812 bgcolor=#E9E9E9
| 150812 ||  || — || September 12, 2001 || Socorro || LINEAR || — || align=right | 2.0 km || 
|-id=813 bgcolor=#E9E9E9
| 150813 ||  || — || September 12, 2001 || Socorro || LINEAR || — || align=right | 2.5 km || 
|-id=814 bgcolor=#E9E9E9
| 150814 ||  || — || September 12, 2001 || Socorro || LINEAR || — || align=right | 1.3 km || 
|-id=815 bgcolor=#fefefe
| 150815 ||  || — || September 12, 2001 || Socorro || LINEAR || — || align=right | 1.1 km || 
|-id=816 bgcolor=#E9E9E9
| 150816 ||  || — || September 12, 2001 || Socorro || LINEAR || BRG || align=right | 2.5 km || 
|-id=817 bgcolor=#fefefe
| 150817 ||  || — || September 12, 2001 || Socorro || LINEAR || — || align=right | 1.6 km || 
|-id=818 bgcolor=#fefefe
| 150818 ||  || — || September 12, 2001 || Socorro || LINEAR || V || align=right | 1.6 km || 
|-id=819 bgcolor=#E9E9E9
| 150819 ||  || — || September 12, 2001 || Socorro || LINEAR || — || align=right | 1.7 km || 
|-id=820 bgcolor=#fefefe
| 150820 ||  || — || September 12, 2001 || Socorro || LINEAR || — || align=right | 1.2 km || 
|-id=821 bgcolor=#E9E9E9
| 150821 ||  || — || September 12, 2001 || Socorro || LINEAR || — || align=right | 2.5 km || 
|-id=822 bgcolor=#E9E9E9
| 150822 ||  || — || September 14, 2001 || Palomar || NEAT || MAR || align=right | 2.5 km || 
|-id=823 bgcolor=#E9E9E9
| 150823 ||  || — || September 17, 2001 || Desert Eagle || W. K. Y. Yeung || — || align=right | 2.6 km || 
|-id=824 bgcolor=#fefefe
| 150824 ||  || — || September 17, 2001 || Desert Eagle || W. K. Y. Yeung || — || align=right | 1.8 km || 
|-id=825 bgcolor=#fefefe
| 150825 ||  || — || September 18, 2001 || Kitt Peak || Spacewatch || — || align=right | 1.3 km || 
|-id=826 bgcolor=#E9E9E9
| 150826 ||  || — || September 16, 2001 || Socorro || LINEAR || — || align=right | 1.3 km || 
|-id=827 bgcolor=#fefefe
| 150827 ||  || — || September 16, 2001 || Socorro || LINEAR || — || align=right | 2.2 km || 
|-id=828 bgcolor=#E9E9E9
| 150828 ||  || — || September 16, 2001 || Socorro || LINEAR || — || align=right | 2.7 km || 
|-id=829 bgcolor=#E9E9E9
| 150829 ||  || — || September 16, 2001 || Socorro || LINEAR || — || align=right | 1.3 km || 
|-id=830 bgcolor=#fefefe
| 150830 ||  || — || September 16, 2001 || Socorro || LINEAR || — || align=right | 1.4 km || 
|-id=831 bgcolor=#E9E9E9
| 150831 ||  || — || September 16, 2001 || Socorro || LINEAR || — || align=right | 2.1 km || 
|-id=832 bgcolor=#E9E9E9
| 150832 ||  || — || September 16, 2001 || Socorro || LINEAR || — || align=right | 1.2 km || 
|-id=833 bgcolor=#E9E9E9
| 150833 ||  || — || September 16, 2001 || Socorro || LINEAR || — || align=right | 1.7 km || 
|-id=834 bgcolor=#fefefe
| 150834 ||  || — || September 16, 2001 || Socorro || LINEAR || MAS || align=right | 1.4 km || 
|-id=835 bgcolor=#E9E9E9
| 150835 ||  || — || September 16, 2001 || Socorro || LINEAR || MAR || align=right | 1.7 km || 
|-id=836 bgcolor=#fefefe
| 150836 ||  || — || September 16, 2001 || Socorro || LINEAR || NYS || align=right data-sort-value="0.96" | 960 m || 
|-id=837 bgcolor=#E9E9E9
| 150837 ||  || — || September 16, 2001 || Socorro || LINEAR || — || align=right | 1.8 km || 
|-id=838 bgcolor=#E9E9E9
| 150838 ||  || — || September 16, 2001 || Socorro || LINEAR || — || align=right | 1.2 km || 
|-id=839 bgcolor=#fefefe
| 150839 ||  || — || September 16, 2001 || Socorro || LINEAR || V || align=right | 1.2 km || 
|-id=840 bgcolor=#fefefe
| 150840 ||  || — || September 16, 2001 || Socorro || LINEAR || — || align=right | 1.3 km || 
|-id=841 bgcolor=#E9E9E9
| 150841 ||  || — || September 16, 2001 || Socorro || LINEAR || — || align=right | 1.6 km || 
|-id=842 bgcolor=#fefefe
| 150842 ||  || — || September 16, 2001 || Socorro || LINEAR || — || align=right | 1.6 km || 
|-id=843 bgcolor=#E9E9E9
| 150843 ||  || — || September 17, 2001 || Socorro || LINEAR || — || align=right | 2.9 km || 
|-id=844 bgcolor=#E9E9E9
| 150844 ||  || — || September 17, 2001 || Socorro || LINEAR || EUN || align=right | 2.1 km || 
|-id=845 bgcolor=#E9E9E9
| 150845 ||  || — || September 17, 2001 || Socorro || LINEAR || ADE || align=right | 3.4 km || 
|-id=846 bgcolor=#E9E9E9
| 150846 ||  || — || September 17, 2001 || Socorro || LINEAR || — || align=right | 1.7 km || 
|-id=847 bgcolor=#E9E9E9
| 150847 ||  || — || September 17, 2001 || Socorro || LINEAR || — || align=right | 2.9 km || 
|-id=848 bgcolor=#E9E9E9
| 150848 ||  || — || September 19, 2001 || Anderson Mesa || LONEOS || RAF || align=right | 1.8 km || 
|-id=849 bgcolor=#fefefe
| 150849 ||  || — || September 20, 2001 || Socorro || LINEAR || — || align=right | 1.1 km || 
|-id=850 bgcolor=#fefefe
| 150850 ||  || — || September 20, 2001 || Socorro || LINEAR || V || align=right | 1.2 km || 
|-id=851 bgcolor=#E9E9E9
| 150851 ||  || — || September 20, 2001 || Socorro || LINEAR || JUN || align=right | 1.3 km || 
|-id=852 bgcolor=#fefefe
| 150852 ||  || — || September 20, 2001 || Socorro || LINEAR || V || align=right | 1.1 km || 
|-id=853 bgcolor=#fefefe
| 150853 ||  || — || September 20, 2001 || Socorro || LINEAR || — || align=right | 1.8 km || 
|-id=854 bgcolor=#E9E9E9
| 150854 ||  || — || September 20, 2001 || Socorro || LINEAR || — || align=right | 5.0 km || 
|-id=855 bgcolor=#E9E9E9
| 150855 ||  || — || September 20, 2001 || Socorro || LINEAR || — || align=right | 3.5 km || 
|-id=856 bgcolor=#E9E9E9
| 150856 ||  || — || September 18, 2001 || Desert Eagle || W. K. Y. Yeung || — || align=right | 1.8 km || 
|-id=857 bgcolor=#E9E9E9
| 150857 ||  || — || September 16, 2001 || Socorro || LINEAR || — || align=right | 1.6 km || 
|-id=858 bgcolor=#E9E9E9
| 150858 ||  || — || September 16, 2001 || Socorro || LINEAR || — || align=right | 1.3 km || 
|-id=859 bgcolor=#fefefe
| 150859 ||  || — || September 16, 2001 || Socorro || LINEAR || NYS || align=right | 1.2 km || 
|-id=860 bgcolor=#fefefe
| 150860 ||  || — || September 16, 2001 || Socorro || LINEAR || — || align=right | 1.5 km || 
|-id=861 bgcolor=#fefefe
| 150861 ||  || — || September 16, 2001 || Socorro || LINEAR || — || align=right | 1.6 km || 
|-id=862 bgcolor=#E9E9E9
| 150862 ||  || — || September 16, 2001 || Socorro || LINEAR || — || align=right | 1.6 km || 
|-id=863 bgcolor=#E9E9E9
| 150863 ||  || — || September 16, 2001 || Socorro || LINEAR || — || align=right | 1.3 km || 
|-id=864 bgcolor=#fefefe
| 150864 ||  || — || September 17, 2001 || Socorro || LINEAR || — || align=right | 1.8 km || 
|-id=865 bgcolor=#fefefe
| 150865 ||  || — || September 17, 2001 || Socorro || LINEAR || — || align=right | 1.5 km || 
|-id=866 bgcolor=#E9E9E9
| 150866 ||  || — || September 17, 2001 || Socorro || LINEAR || RAF || align=right | 1.6 km || 
|-id=867 bgcolor=#E9E9E9
| 150867 ||  || — || September 17, 2001 || Socorro || LINEAR || — || align=right | 1.7 km || 
|-id=868 bgcolor=#E9E9E9
| 150868 ||  || — || September 16, 2001 || Socorro || LINEAR || — || align=right | 2.4 km || 
|-id=869 bgcolor=#fefefe
| 150869 ||  || — || September 19, 2001 || Socorro || LINEAR || V || align=right | 1.4 km || 
|-id=870 bgcolor=#fefefe
| 150870 ||  || — || September 19, 2001 || Socorro || LINEAR || NYS || align=right data-sort-value="0.83" | 830 m || 
|-id=871 bgcolor=#E9E9E9
| 150871 ||  || — || September 19, 2001 || Socorro || LINEAR || — || align=right | 1.5 km || 
|-id=872 bgcolor=#C2FFFF
| 150872 ||  || — || September 19, 2001 || Socorro || LINEAR || L5 || align=right | 12 km || 
|-id=873 bgcolor=#fefefe
| 150873 ||  || — || September 19, 2001 || Socorro || LINEAR || NYS || align=right | 1.1 km || 
|-id=874 bgcolor=#fefefe
| 150874 ||  || — || September 19, 2001 || Socorro || LINEAR || V || align=right | 1.3 km || 
|-id=875 bgcolor=#E9E9E9
| 150875 ||  || — || September 19, 2001 || Socorro || LINEAR || — || align=right | 1.3 km || 
|-id=876 bgcolor=#C2FFFF
| 150876 ||  || — || September 19, 2001 || Socorro || LINEAR || L5 || align=right | 11 km || 
|-id=877 bgcolor=#d6d6d6
| 150877 ||  || — || September 19, 2001 || Socorro || LINEAR || — || align=right | 4.2 km || 
|-id=878 bgcolor=#fefefe
| 150878 ||  || — || September 19, 2001 || Socorro || LINEAR || V || align=right | 1.4 km || 
|-id=879 bgcolor=#E9E9E9
| 150879 ||  || — || September 19, 2001 || Socorro || LINEAR || — || align=right | 2.3 km || 
|-id=880 bgcolor=#E9E9E9
| 150880 ||  || — || September 19, 2001 || Socorro || LINEAR || — || align=right | 2.9 km || 
|-id=881 bgcolor=#fefefe
| 150881 ||  || — || September 19, 2001 || Socorro || LINEAR || — || align=right | 1.5 km || 
|-id=882 bgcolor=#fefefe
| 150882 ||  || — || September 19, 2001 || Socorro || LINEAR || NYS || align=right | 1.2 km || 
|-id=883 bgcolor=#E9E9E9
| 150883 ||  || — || September 19, 2001 || Socorro || LINEAR || EUN || align=right | 1.9 km || 
|-id=884 bgcolor=#fefefe
| 150884 ||  || — || September 19, 2001 || Socorro || LINEAR || NYS || align=right data-sort-value="0.93" | 930 m || 
|-id=885 bgcolor=#E9E9E9
| 150885 ||  || — || September 19, 2001 || Socorro || LINEAR || — || align=right | 2.1 km || 
|-id=886 bgcolor=#E9E9E9
| 150886 ||  || — || September 19, 2001 || Socorro || LINEAR || HEN || align=right | 1.7 km || 
|-id=887 bgcolor=#fefefe
| 150887 ||  || — || September 19, 2001 || Socorro || LINEAR || — || align=right | 1.5 km || 
|-id=888 bgcolor=#fefefe
| 150888 ||  || — || September 19, 2001 || Socorro || LINEAR || MAS || align=right | 1.3 km || 
|-id=889 bgcolor=#fefefe
| 150889 ||  || — || September 20, 2001 || Socorro || LINEAR || — || align=right | 1.5 km || 
|-id=890 bgcolor=#E9E9E9
| 150890 ||  || — || September 25, 2001 || Desert Eagle || W. K. Y. Yeung || XIZ || align=right | 2.6 km || 
|-id=891 bgcolor=#E9E9E9
| 150891 ||  || — || September 21, 2001 || Socorro || LINEAR || — || align=right | 1.5 km || 
|-id=892 bgcolor=#E9E9E9
| 150892 ||  || — || September 21, 2001 || Anderson Mesa || LONEOS || — || align=right | 2.8 km || 
|-id=893 bgcolor=#E9E9E9
| 150893 ||  || — || September 21, 2001 || Anderson Mesa || LONEOS || — || align=right | 1.8 km || 
|-id=894 bgcolor=#E9E9E9
| 150894 ||  || — || September 21, 2001 || Anderson Mesa || LONEOS || INO || align=right | 2.6 km || 
|-id=895 bgcolor=#E9E9E9
| 150895 ||  || — || September 22, 2001 || Socorro || LINEAR || EUN || align=right | 3.3 km || 
|-id=896 bgcolor=#E9E9E9
| 150896 ||  || — || September 29, 2001 || Palomar || NEAT || EUN || align=right | 1.8 km || 
|-id=897 bgcolor=#fefefe
| 150897 ||  || — || September 16, 2001 || Socorro || LINEAR || — || align=right | 1.3 km || 
|-id=898 bgcolor=#E9E9E9
| 150898 ||  || — || September 20, 2001 || Socorro || LINEAR || — || align=right | 1.6 km || 
|-id=899 bgcolor=#fefefe
| 150899 ||  || — || September 21, 2001 || Socorro || LINEAR || NYS || align=right | 2.4 km || 
|-id=900 bgcolor=#E9E9E9
| 150900 ||  || — || September 25, 2001 || Socorro || LINEAR || MAR || align=right | 2.5 km || 
|}

150901–151000 

|-bgcolor=#fefefe
| 150901 ||  || — || September 19, 2001 || Socorro || LINEAR || NYS || align=right data-sort-value="0.97" | 970 m || 
|-id=902 bgcolor=#E9E9E9
| 150902 ||  || — || September 25, 2001 || Socorro || LINEAR || — || align=right | 1.5 km || 
|-id=903 bgcolor=#E9E9E9
| 150903 ||  || — || September 21, 2001 || Desert Eagle || W. K. Y. Yeung || — || align=right | 1.2 km || 
|-id=904 bgcolor=#E9E9E9
| 150904 ||  || — || September 26, 2001 || Socorro || LINEAR || — || align=right | 1.9 km || 
|-id=905 bgcolor=#fefefe
| 150905 ||  || — || September 18, 2001 || Kitt Peak || Spacewatch || V || align=right | 1.1 km || 
|-id=906 bgcolor=#E9E9E9
| 150906 || 2001 TF || — || October 8, 2001 || Socorro || LINEAR || — || align=right | 2.8 km || 
|-id=907 bgcolor=#E9E9E9
| 150907 ||  || — || October 7, 2001 || Palomar || NEAT || HEN || align=right | 1.6 km || 
|-id=908 bgcolor=#fefefe
| 150908 ||  || — || October 8, 2001 || Palomar || NEAT || — || align=right | 1.6 km || 
|-id=909 bgcolor=#E9E9E9
| 150909 ||  || — || October 13, 2001 || Socorro || LINEAR || HEN || align=right | 1.9 km || 
|-id=910 bgcolor=#E9E9E9
| 150910 ||  || — || October 14, 2001 || Socorro || LINEAR || EUN || align=right | 2.7 km || 
|-id=911 bgcolor=#E9E9E9
| 150911 ||  || — || October 14, 2001 || Socorro || LINEAR || — || align=right | 1.3 km || 
|-id=912 bgcolor=#fefefe
| 150912 ||  || — || October 14, 2001 || Socorro || LINEAR || — || align=right | 1.8 km || 
|-id=913 bgcolor=#E9E9E9
| 150913 ||  || — || October 14, 2001 || Socorro || LINEAR || — || align=right | 3.4 km || 
|-id=914 bgcolor=#E9E9E9
| 150914 ||  || — || October 14, 2001 || Socorro || LINEAR || — || align=right | 2.3 km || 
|-id=915 bgcolor=#E9E9E9
| 150915 ||  || — || October 14, 2001 || Socorro || LINEAR || — || align=right | 4.3 km || 
|-id=916 bgcolor=#E9E9E9
| 150916 ||  || — || October 14, 2001 || Socorro || LINEAR || — || align=right | 7.2 km || 
|-id=917 bgcolor=#E9E9E9
| 150917 ||  || — || October 14, 2001 || Socorro || LINEAR || — || align=right | 4.3 km || 
|-id=918 bgcolor=#E9E9E9
| 150918 ||  || — || October 14, 2001 || Socorro || LINEAR || — || align=right | 1.6 km || 
|-id=919 bgcolor=#E9E9E9
| 150919 ||  || — || October 14, 2001 || Socorro || LINEAR || EUN || align=right | 1.7 km || 
|-id=920 bgcolor=#E9E9E9
| 150920 ||  || — || October 13, 2001 || Socorro || LINEAR || — || align=right | 1.7 km || 
|-id=921 bgcolor=#E9E9E9
| 150921 ||  || — || October 13, 2001 || Socorro || LINEAR || — || align=right | 1.6 km || 
|-id=922 bgcolor=#E9E9E9
| 150922 ||  || — || October 13, 2001 || Socorro || LINEAR || — || align=right | 2.0 km || 
|-id=923 bgcolor=#E9E9E9
| 150923 ||  || — || October 13, 2001 || Socorro || LINEAR || — || align=right | 1.4 km || 
|-id=924 bgcolor=#E9E9E9
| 150924 ||  || — || October 13, 2001 || Socorro || LINEAR || — || align=right | 2.0 km || 
|-id=925 bgcolor=#E9E9E9
| 150925 ||  || — || October 13, 2001 || Socorro || LINEAR || — || align=right | 3.8 km || 
|-id=926 bgcolor=#E9E9E9
| 150926 ||  || — || October 13, 2001 || Socorro || LINEAR || — || align=right | 1.9 km || 
|-id=927 bgcolor=#fefefe
| 150927 ||  || — || October 13, 2001 || Socorro || LINEAR || SUL || align=right | 4.9 km || 
|-id=928 bgcolor=#E9E9E9
| 150928 ||  || — || October 13, 2001 || Socorro || LINEAR || — || align=right | 3.4 km || 
|-id=929 bgcolor=#fefefe
| 150929 ||  || — || October 13, 2001 || Socorro || LINEAR || — || align=right | 1.6 km || 
|-id=930 bgcolor=#E9E9E9
| 150930 ||  || — || October 13, 2001 || Socorro || LINEAR || EUN || align=right | 2.3 km || 
|-id=931 bgcolor=#E9E9E9
| 150931 ||  || — || October 13, 2001 || Socorro || LINEAR || — || align=right | 2.6 km || 
|-id=932 bgcolor=#d6d6d6
| 150932 ||  || — || October 13, 2001 || Socorro || LINEAR || — || align=right | 4.5 km || 
|-id=933 bgcolor=#E9E9E9
| 150933 ||  || — || October 13, 2001 || Socorro || LINEAR || — || align=right | 1.3 km || 
|-id=934 bgcolor=#E9E9E9
| 150934 ||  || — || October 13, 2001 || Socorro || LINEAR || — || align=right | 2.3 km || 
|-id=935 bgcolor=#E9E9E9
| 150935 ||  || — || October 13, 2001 || Socorro || LINEAR || — || align=right | 3.5 km || 
|-id=936 bgcolor=#E9E9E9
| 150936 ||  || — || October 14, 2001 || Socorro || LINEAR || — || align=right | 2.8 km || 
|-id=937 bgcolor=#fefefe
| 150937 ||  || — || October 14, 2001 || Socorro || LINEAR || — || align=right | 1.5 km || 
|-id=938 bgcolor=#E9E9E9
| 150938 ||  || — || October 14, 2001 || Socorro || LINEAR || AGN || align=right | 1.6 km || 
|-id=939 bgcolor=#E9E9E9
| 150939 ||  || — || October 14, 2001 || Socorro || LINEAR || — || align=right | 1.5 km || 
|-id=940 bgcolor=#fefefe
| 150940 ||  || — || October 14, 2001 || Socorro || LINEAR || V || align=right | 1.7 km || 
|-id=941 bgcolor=#E9E9E9
| 150941 ||  || — || October 14, 2001 || Socorro || LINEAR || — || align=right | 2.0 km || 
|-id=942 bgcolor=#E9E9E9
| 150942 ||  || — || October 15, 2001 || Socorro || LINEAR || — || align=right | 2.8 km || 
|-id=943 bgcolor=#E9E9E9
| 150943 ||  || — || October 13, 2001 || Socorro || LINEAR || — || align=right | 1.8 km || 
|-id=944 bgcolor=#E9E9E9
| 150944 ||  || — || October 13, 2001 || Socorro || LINEAR || MAR || align=right | 3.9 km || 
|-id=945 bgcolor=#E9E9E9
| 150945 ||  || — || October 13, 2001 || Socorro || LINEAR || — || align=right | 3.0 km || 
|-id=946 bgcolor=#E9E9E9
| 150946 ||  || — || October 14, 2001 || Socorro || LINEAR || — || align=right | 2.5 km || 
|-id=947 bgcolor=#E9E9E9
| 150947 ||  || — || October 14, 2001 || Socorro || LINEAR || — || align=right | 2.1 km || 
|-id=948 bgcolor=#E9E9E9
| 150948 ||  || — || October 14, 2001 || Socorro || LINEAR || — || align=right | 3.8 km || 
|-id=949 bgcolor=#E9E9E9
| 150949 ||  || — || October 15, 2001 || Socorro || LINEAR || — || align=right | 2.5 km || 
|-id=950 bgcolor=#E9E9E9
| 150950 ||  || — || October 15, 2001 || Socorro || LINEAR || — || align=right | 2.1 km || 
|-id=951 bgcolor=#E9E9E9
| 150951 ||  || — || October 15, 2001 || Socorro || LINEAR || — || align=right | 3.0 km || 
|-id=952 bgcolor=#E9E9E9
| 150952 ||  || — || October 12, 2001 || Haleakala || NEAT || DOR || align=right | 4.3 km || 
|-id=953 bgcolor=#E9E9E9
| 150953 ||  || — || October 12, 2001 || Haleakala || NEAT || — || align=right | 2.0 km || 
|-id=954 bgcolor=#E9E9E9
| 150954 ||  || — || October 13, 2001 || Kitt Peak || Spacewatch || — || align=right | 1.2 km || 
|-id=955 bgcolor=#E9E9E9
| 150955 ||  || — || October 11, 2001 || Palomar || NEAT || — || align=right | 3.9 km || 
|-id=956 bgcolor=#E9E9E9
| 150956 ||  || — || October 12, 2001 || Haleakala || NEAT || — || align=right | 2.4 km || 
|-id=957 bgcolor=#E9E9E9
| 150957 ||  || — || October 10, 2001 || Palomar || NEAT || AGN || align=right | 1.9 km || 
|-id=958 bgcolor=#fefefe
| 150958 ||  || — || October 10, 2001 || Palomar || NEAT || — || align=right | 3.6 km || 
|-id=959 bgcolor=#E9E9E9
| 150959 ||  || — || October 10, 2001 || Palomar || NEAT || — || align=right | 2.0 km || 
|-id=960 bgcolor=#E9E9E9
| 150960 ||  || — || October 10, 2001 || Palomar || NEAT || AGN || align=right | 1.9 km || 
|-id=961 bgcolor=#E9E9E9
| 150961 ||  || — || October 11, 2001 || Palomar || NEAT || — || align=right | 1.4 km || 
|-id=962 bgcolor=#E9E9E9
| 150962 ||  || — || October 11, 2001 || Palomar || NEAT || — || align=right | 1.3 km || 
|-id=963 bgcolor=#E9E9E9
| 150963 ||  || — || October 11, 2001 || Palomar || NEAT || — || align=right | 1.6 km || 
|-id=964 bgcolor=#E9E9E9
| 150964 ||  || — || October 11, 2001 || Palomar || NEAT || — || align=right | 1.6 km || 
|-id=965 bgcolor=#E9E9E9
| 150965 ||  || — || October 15, 2001 || Palomar || NEAT || — || align=right | 1.9 km || 
|-id=966 bgcolor=#E9E9E9
| 150966 ||  || — || October 15, 2001 || Socorro || LINEAR || BRG || align=right | 3.1 km || 
|-id=967 bgcolor=#E9E9E9
| 150967 ||  || — || October 15, 2001 || Socorro || LINEAR || — || align=right | 3.4 km || 
|-id=968 bgcolor=#E9E9E9
| 150968 ||  || — || October 15, 2001 || Socorro || LINEAR || MAR || align=right | 2.1 km || 
|-id=969 bgcolor=#E9E9E9
| 150969 ||  || — || October 13, 2001 || Socorro || LINEAR || — || align=right | 1.3 km || 
|-id=970 bgcolor=#E9E9E9
| 150970 ||  || — || October 14, 2001 || Socorro || LINEAR || — || align=right | 3.0 km || 
|-id=971 bgcolor=#E9E9E9
| 150971 ||  || — || October 14, 2001 || Socorro || LINEAR || — || align=right | 2.7 km || 
|-id=972 bgcolor=#E9E9E9
| 150972 ||  || — || October 15, 2001 || Palomar || NEAT || ADE || align=right | 2.6 km || 
|-id=973 bgcolor=#E9E9E9
| 150973 ||  || — || October 15, 2001 || Palomar || NEAT || KRM || align=right | 3.8 km || 
|-id=974 bgcolor=#E9E9E9
| 150974 ||  || — || October 14, 2001 || Haleakala || NEAT || — || align=right | 3.0 km || 
|-id=975 bgcolor=#E9E9E9
| 150975 ||  || — || October 15, 2001 || Haleakala || NEAT || EUN || align=right | 2.0 km || 
|-id=976 bgcolor=#fefefe
| 150976 ||  || — || October 13, 2001 || Anderson Mesa || LONEOS || V || align=right | 1.2 km || 
|-id=977 bgcolor=#E9E9E9
| 150977 ||  || — || October 13, 2001 || Anderson Mesa || LONEOS || — || align=right | 1.8 km || 
|-id=978 bgcolor=#E9E9E9
| 150978 ||  || — || October 13, 2001 || Palomar || NEAT || ADE || align=right | 2.8 km || 
|-id=979 bgcolor=#E9E9E9
| 150979 ||  || — || October 13, 2001 || Palomar || NEAT || — || align=right | 1.8 km || 
|-id=980 bgcolor=#E9E9E9
| 150980 ||  || — || October 13, 2001 || Palomar || NEAT || EUN || align=right | 2.4 km || 
|-id=981 bgcolor=#E9E9E9
| 150981 ||  || — || October 14, 2001 || Socorro || LINEAR || — || align=right | 2.6 km || 
|-id=982 bgcolor=#E9E9E9
| 150982 ||  || — || October 14, 2001 || Anderson Mesa || LONEOS || JUN || align=right | 1.4 km || 
|-id=983 bgcolor=#E9E9E9
| 150983 ||  || — || October 15, 2001 || Socorro || LINEAR || EUN || align=right | 1.8 km || 
|-id=984 bgcolor=#E9E9E9
| 150984 ||  || — || October 15, 2001 || Haleakala || NEAT || MAR || align=right | 2.0 km || 
|-id=985 bgcolor=#E9E9E9
| 150985 ||  || — || October 15, 2001 || Haleakala || NEAT || — || align=right | 2.2 km || 
|-id=986 bgcolor=#E9E9E9
| 150986 ||  || — || October 15, 2001 || Palomar || NEAT || — || align=right | 1.8 km || 
|-id=987 bgcolor=#E9E9E9
| 150987 ||  || — || October 14, 2001 || Socorro || LINEAR || EUN || align=right | 1.8 km || 
|-id=988 bgcolor=#E9E9E9
| 150988 ||  || — || October 13, 2001 || Anderson Mesa || LONEOS || — || align=right | 3.4 km || 
|-id=989 bgcolor=#E9E9E9
| 150989 ||  || — || October 17, 2001 || Desert Eagle || W. K. Y. Yeung || MIS || align=right | 4.3 km || 
|-id=990 bgcolor=#E9E9E9
| 150990 ||  || — || October 17, 2001 || Socorro || LINEAR || — || align=right | 3.6 km || 
|-id=991 bgcolor=#E9E9E9
| 150991 ||  || — || October 17, 2001 || Socorro || LINEAR || — || align=right | 2.6 km || 
|-id=992 bgcolor=#E9E9E9
| 150992 ||  || — || October 24, 2001 || Desert Eagle || W. K. Y. Yeung || — || align=right | 2.2 km || 
|-id=993 bgcolor=#E9E9E9
| 150993 ||  || — || October 25, 2001 || Desert Eagle || W. K. Y. Yeung || — || align=right | 1.3 km || 
|-id=994 bgcolor=#E9E9E9
| 150994 ||  || — || October 18, 2001 || Socorro || LINEAR || MAR || align=right | 2.1 km || 
|-id=995 bgcolor=#E9E9E9
| 150995 ||  || — || October 18, 2001 || Socorro || LINEAR || — || align=right | 2.1 km || 
|-id=996 bgcolor=#E9E9E9
| 150996 ||  || — || October 16, 2001 || Socorro || LINEAR || — || align=right | 1.5 km || 
|-id=997 bgcolor=#E9E9E9
| 150997 ||  || — || October 16, 2001 || Socorro || LINEAR || — || align=right | 2.2 km || 
|-id=998 bgcolor=#E9E9E9
| 150998 ||  || — || October 16, 2001 || Socorro || LINEAR || — || align=right | 2.8 km || 
|-id=999 bgcolor=#E9E9E9
| 150999 ||  || — || October 16, 2001 || Socorro || LINEAR || — || align=right | 2.8 km || 
|-id=000 bgcolor=#E9E9E9
| 151000 ||  || — || October 16, 2001 || Socorro || LINEAR || — || align=right | 2.8 km || 
|}

References

External links 
 Discovery Circumstances: Numbered Minor Planets (150001)–(155000) (IAU Minor Planet Center)

0150